This list includes plants native and introduced to the state of Indiana, designated (N) and (I), respectively. Varieties and subspecies link to their parent species.

A 
Abies balsamea var. balsamea (I)
Abutilon theophrasti (I)
Acalypha deamii (N)
Acalypha gracilens (N)
Acalypha ostryifolia (N)
Acalypha rhomboidea (N)
Acalypha virginica (N)
Acer campestre (I)  -- field maple
Acer × freemanii (N)  -- Freeman maple
Acer ginnala (I)  --  Amur maple
Acer negundo var. negundo (N)  --  boxelder maple
Acer negundo var. violaceum (N)  --  
Acer nigrum (N)  --  black maple
Acer palmatum (I)  --  
Acer pensylvanicum (N)  --  striped maple, moosewood
Acer platanoides (I)  --  
Acer rubrum var. rubrum (N)  --  red maple
Acer rubrum var. trilobum (N)  --  
Acer saccharinum (N)  --  silver mapl
Acer saccharum var. saccharum (N)  --  sugar maple
Acer spicatum (N)  --  mountain maple, dwarf maple
Acer tataricum (I)  --  
Achillea millefolium var. occidentalis (N)
Achillea millefolium var. millefolium (I)
Achillea ptarmica (I)
Achyranthes japonica var. hachijoensis (I)
Acinos arvensis (I)
Aconitum noveboracense (N)
Aconitum uncinatum ssp. uncinatum (N)
Acorus americanus (N)
Acorus calamus (I)
Acroptilon repens (I)
Actaea pachypoda (N)
Actaea racemosa var. racemosa (N)
Actaea rubra ssp. rubra (N)
Actinidia arguta (I)
Adiantum capillus-veneris (N)
Adiantum pedatum (N)
Adlumia fungosa (N)
Aegilops cylindrica (I)
Aegopodium podagraria (I)
Aesculus flava (N)
Aesculus glabra var. glabra (N)
Aesculus hippocastanum (I)
Aesculus × marylandica (N)
Aethusa cynapium (I)
Agalinis auriculata (N)
Agalinis gattingeri (N)
Agalinis paupercula var. borealis (N)
Agalinis paupercula var. paupercula (N)
Agalinis purpurea (N)
Agalinis skinneriana (N)
Agalinis tenuifolia var. macrophylla (N)
Agalinis tenuifolia var. parviflora (N)
Agalinis tenuifolia var. tenuifolia (N)
Agastache nepetoides (N)
Agastache scrophulariifolia (N)
Ageratina altissima var. altissima (N)
Ageratina aromatica var. aromatica (N)
Agrimonia eupatoria (I)
Agrimonia gryposepala (N)  --  common agrimony
Agrimonia microcarpa (N)
Agrimonia parviflora (N)
Agrimonia pubescens (N)
Agrimonia rostellata (N)
Agrimonia striata (N)
Agropyron desertorum (I)
Agrostemma githago (I)
Agrostis avenacea (I)
Agrostis capillaris (I)
Agrostis elliottiana (N)  --  Elliott's bent grass
Agrostis gigantea (I)
Agrostis hyemalis (N)
Agrostis perennans (N)
Agrostis scabra (N)
Agrostis stolonifera (I)
Ailanthus altissima (I)
Aira caryophyllea var. caryophyllea (I)
Ajuga genevensis (I)
Ajuga reptans (I)
Akebia quinata (I)
Albizia julibrissin (I)
Alcea rosea (I)
Aletris farinosa (N)
Alisma subcordatum (N)
Alisma triviale (N)
Alliaria petiolata (I)
Allium ampeloprasum (I)
Allium burdickii (N)
Allium canadense var. canadense (N)
Allium cepa (I)
Allium cernuum var. cernuum (N)
Allium porrum (I)
Allium sativum (I)
Allium schoenoprasum (I)
Allium schoenoprasum var. sibiricum (N)
Allium tricoccum (N)
Allium vineale ssp. vineale (I)
Alnus × fallacina (N)
Alnus glutinosa (I)
Alnus incana ssp. rugosa (N)
Alnus serrulata (N)
Alopecurus aequalis var. aequalis (N)
Alopecurus carolinianus (N)
Alopecurus geniculatus var. geniculatus (I)
Alopecurus myosuroides (I)
Alopecurus myosuroides (N)
Alopecurus pratensis (I)
Althaea officinalis (I)
Alyssum alyssoides (I)
Amaranthus albus (I)  --  common tumbleweed,
Amaranthus blitoides (I)  --  
Amaranthus blitum var. emarginatus (I)  --  
Amaranthus cruentus (I)  --  
Amaranthus deflexus (I)  --  
Amaranthus hybridus (N)  -- green amaranth 
Amaranthus palmeri (N)  --  Palmer's pigweed
Amaranthus powellii ssp. powellii (N)  --  
Amaranthus retroflexus (N)  --  
Amaranthus spinosus (N)  --  
Amaranthus tuberculatus (N)  --  
Ambrosia artemisiifolia var. elatior (N)
Ambrosia artemisiifolia var. elatior (I)
Ambrosia bidentata (N)
Ambrosia × helenae (N)
Ambrosia trifida var. trifida (N)
Amelanchier arborea var. arborea (N)
Amelanchier interior (N)
Amelanchier laevis (N)
Amelanchier sanguinea var. sanguinea (N)
Amelanchier stolonifera (N)
Ammannia coccinea (N)
Ammannia robusta (N)
Ammophila breviligulata (N)
Amorpha fruticosa (N)
Ampelopsis aconitifolia (I)
Ampelopsis arborea (N)
Ampelopsis glandulosa var. brevipedunculata (I)
Ampelopsis cordata (N)
Amphiachyris dracunculoides (N)
Amphicarpaea bracteata var. bracteata (N)
Amphicarpaea bracteata var. comosa (N)
Amsinckia lycopsoides (N)
Amsonia tabernaemontana var. salicifolia (N)
Anagallis arvensis ssp. foemina (N)
Anagallis arvensis ssp. arvensis (I)
Anagallis arvensis ssp. foemina (I)
Anagallis minima (N)
Anaphalis margaritacea (N)
Anchusa arvensis (I)
Anchusa azurea (I)
Anchusa officinalis (I)
Andromeda polifolia var. glaucophylla (N)
Andropogon gerardi (N)
Andropogon glomeratus var. glomeratus (N)
Andropogon gyrans var. gyrans (N)
Andropogon virginicus var. virginicus (N)
Androsace occidentalis (N)
Anemone blanda (I)
Anemone canadensis (N)
Anemone cylindrica (N)
Anemone quinquefolia var. bifolia (N)
Anemone quinquefolia var. quinquefolia (N)
Anemone virginiana var. virginiana (N)
Anethum graveolens (I)
Angelica atropurpurea (N)
Angelica venenosa (N)
Anoda cristata (N)
Antennaria howellii ssp. canadensis (N)
Antennaria howellii ssp. neodioica (N)
Antennaria howellii ssp. petaloidea (N)
Antennaria neglecta (N)
Antennaria parlinii ssp. fallax (N)
Antennaria parlinii ssp. parlinii (N)
Antennaria plantaginifolia (N)
Antennaria solitaria (N)
Antennaria virginica (N)
Anthemis arvensis (I)
Anthemis cotula (I)
Anthemis tinctoria (I)
Anthoxanthum aristatum (I)
Anthoxanthum odoratum ssp. odoratum (I)
Anthriscus caucalis (I)
Anthriscus sylvestris (I)
Anthyllis vulneraria (I)
Antirrhinum majus (I)
Apera interrupta (I)
Apera spica-venti (I)
Apios americana (N)
Apium graveolens var. dulce (N)
Apium graveolens var. dulce (I)
Aplectrum hyemale (N)
Apocynum androsaemifolium (N)
Apocynum cannabinum (N)
Apocynum × floribundum (N)
Aquilegia canadensis (N)
Aquilegia vulgaris (I)
Arabidopsis thaliana (I)
Arabis canadensis (N)
Arabis × divaricarpa (N)
Arabis drummondii (N)
Arabis glabra (N)
Arabis hirsuta var. pycnocarpa (N)
Arabis laevigata var. laevigata (N)
Arabis lyrata (N)
Arabis missouriensis (N)
Arabis patens (N)
Arabis shortii (N)
Aralia elata (I)
Aralia hispida (N)
Aralia nudicaulis (N)
Aralia racemosa ssp. racemosa (N)
Aralia spinosa (N)
Arctium lappa (I)
Arctium minus (I)
Arctostaphylos uva-ursi (N)
Arenaria serpyllifolia (I)
Arethusa bulbosa (N)
Argemone albiflora ssp. albiflora (N)
Argemone mexicana (N)
Argentina anserina (N)
Arisaema dracontium (N)
Arisaema triphyllum ssp. pusillum (N)
Arisaema triphyllum ssp. stewardsonii (N)
Arisaema triphyllum ssp. triphyllum (N)
Aristida dichotoma var. dichotoma (N)
Aristida longespica var. geniculata (N)
Aristida longespica var. longespica (N)
Aristida oligantha (N)
Aristida purpurascens var. purpurascens (N)
Aristida ramosissima (N)
Aristolochia clematitis (I)
Aristolochia serpentaria (N)
Aristolochia tomentosa (N)
Armoracia rusticana (I)
Arnoglossum atriplicifolium (N)
Arnoglossum plantagineum (N)
Arnoglossum reniforme (N)
Arnoseris minima (I)
Arrhenatherum elatius var. elatius (I)
Artemisia absinthium (I)
Artemisia annua (I)
Artemisia biennis (N)
Artemisia biennis var. biennis (I)
Artemisia campestris ssp. borealis var. borealis (N)
Artemisia campestris ssp. caudata (N)
Artemisia gmelinii (I)
Artemisia ludoviciana ssp. albula (N)
Artemisia ludoviciana ssp. ludoviciana (N)
Artemisia pontica (I)
Artemisia stelleriana (I)
Artemisia stelleriana (N)
Artemisia vulgaris (N)
Artemisia vulgaris var. vulgaris (I)
Arthraxon hispidus (I)
Aruncus dioicus (I)
Aruncus dioicus var. dioicus (N)
Arundinaria gigantea ssp. gigantea (N)
Asarum canadense (N)
Asclepias amplexicaulis (N) -- sand milkweed
Asclepias exaltata (N) -- poke milkweed
Asclepias hirtella (N) -- tall green milkweed
Asclepias incarnata ssp. incarnata (N) -- swamp milkweed
Asclepias purpurascens (N) -- purple milkweed
Asclepias quadrifolia (N) -- whorled milkweed
Asclepias sullivantii (N) -- prairie milkweed
Asclepias syriaca (N) -- common milkweed
Asclepias tuberosa ssp. interior (N) -- butterfly weed
Asclepias tuberosa ssp. tuberosa (N) -- butterfly weed
Asclepias variegata (N) -- white milkweed
Asclepias verticillata (N) -- eastern whorled milkweed
Asclepias viridiflora (N) -- green-flower milkweed
Asclepias viridis (N) -- green or spider milkweed
Asimina triloba (N)
Asparagus officinalis (I)
Asperugo procumbens (I)
Asplenium bradleyi (N)  --  Bradley's spleenwort or cliff spleenwort
Asplenium × clermontiae (N)
Asplenium × ebenoides (N)
Asplenium × gravesii (N)
Asplenium × inexpectatum (N)
Asplenium × kentuckiense (N)
Asplenium montanum (N)
Asplenium pinnatifidum (N)
Asplenium platyneuron var. platyneuron (N)
Asplenium resiliens (N)
Asplenium rhizophyllum (N)
Asplenium ruta-muraria var. cryptolepis (N)
Asplenium ruta-muraria var. lanceolum (N)
Asplenium trichomanes ssp. quadrivalens (N)
Asplenium trichomanes ssp. trichomanes (N)
Asplenium × trudellii (N)
Aster tataricus (I)
Astragalus canadensis var. canadensis (N)
Astragalus neglectus (N)
Athyrium filix-femina ssp. angustum (N)
Athyrium filix-femina ssp. asplenioides (N)
Atriplex hortensis (I)
Atriplex patula (I)
Atriplex prostrata (N)
Atriplex rosea (I)
Aureolaria flava var. flava (N)
Aureolaria flava var. macrantha (N)
Aureolaria levigata (N)
Aureolaria pedicularia var. ambigens (N)
Aureolaria pedicularia var. pedicularia (N)
Aureolaria virginica (N)
Aurinia saxatilis (I)
Avena fatua (I)
Avena sativa (I)
Azolla caroliniana (N)

B 
Ballota nigra var. alba (I)
Baptisia alba var. macrophylla (N)
Baptisia australis var. australis (N)
Baptisia tinctoria (N)
Barbarea verna (I)
Barbarea vulgaris (I)
Bartonia virginica (N)
Bassia hirsuta (I)
Bassia scoparia (I)
Beckmannia syzigachne (N)
Belamcanda chinensis (I)
Bellis perennis (I)
Berberis × ottawensis (N)
Berberis thunbergii (I)
Berberis vulgaris (I)
Berteroa incana (I)
Besseya bullii (N)
Betula alleghaniensis var. alleghaniensis (N)  --  yellow birch
Betula alleghaniensis var. macrolepis (N)  --  yellow birch
Betula lenta (N)  --  Black birch, cherry birch
Betula nigra (N)  --  black birch, river birch or water birch
Betula papyrifera var. papyrifera (N)  --  paper birch, white birch and canoe birch
Betula pendula (I)  --  
Betula populifolia (N)  --  gray or grey birch
Betula pubescens (N)  -- downy birch 
Betula pubescens ssp. pubescens (I)  --  
Betula pumila var. pumila (N)  --  
Betula × purpusii (N)  --  
Bidens aristosa (N)  --  bearded beggarticks
Bidens beckii (N)
Bidens bipinnata (N)
Bidens cernua (N)
Bidens connata (N)
Bidens coronata (N)
Bidens discoidea (N)
Bidens frondosa (N)
Bidens laevis (N)
Bidens tripartita (N)
Bidens vulgata (N)
Bignonia capreolata (N)
Blephilia ciliata (N)
Blephilia hirsuta var. hirsuta (N)
Boehmeria cylindrica (N)
Boltonia asteroides var. recognita (N)
Borago officinalis (I)
Botrychium biternatum (N)
Botrychium dissectum (N)
Botrychium lanceolatum var. angustisegmentum (N)
Botrychium matricariifolium (N)
Botrychium multifidum (N)
Botrychium oneidense (N)
Botrychium simplex (N)
Botrychium virginianum (N)
Bouteloua curtipendula var. curtipendula (N)
Bouteloua gracilis (N)
Bouteloua hirsuta var. hirsuta (N)
Brachyelytrum erectum (N)
Brasenia schreberi (N)
Brassica juncea (I)  --   brown mustard, Chinese mustard, Indian mustard
Brassica napus (I)
Brassica nigra (I)
Brassica oleracea (I)
Brassica rapa var. amplexicaulis (I)
Brassica rapa var. rapa (I)
Brickellia eupatorioides var. corymbulosa (N)
Brickellia eupatorioides var. eupatorioides (N)
Bromus arvensis (I)
Bromus briziformis (I)
Bromus catharticus (I)
Bromus ciliatus var. ciliatus (N)
Bromus erectus (I)
Bromus hordeaceus ssp. hordeaceus (I)
Bromus inermis (N)
Bromus inermis ssp. inermis var. inermis (I)
Bromus kalmii (N)
Bromus latiglumis (N)
Bromus nottowayanus (N)
Bromus pubescens (N)
Bromus racemosus (I)
Bromus secalinus var. secalinus (I)
Bromus sterilis (I)
Bromus tectorum (I)
Broussonetia papyrifera (I)
Browallia americana (I)
Brunnera macrophylla (I)
Buchnera americana (N)
Buddleja davidii (I)
Buglossoides arvensis (I)
Bulbostylis capillaris ssp. capillaris (N)
Bunias orientalis (I)
Bupleurum lancifolium (I)
Bupleurum rotundifolium (I)
Butomus umbellatus (I)
Buxus sempervirens (I)

C 
Cabomba caroliniana var. caroliniana (N)
Cakile edentula ssp. edentula var. lacustris (N)
Cakile edentula ssp. edentula (N)
Calamagrostis canadensis var. canadensis (N)
Calamagrostis canadensis var. macouniana (N)
Calamagrostis coarctata (N)
Calamagrostis porteri ssp. insperata (N)
Calamagrostis stricta ssp. inexpansa (N)
Calamovilfa longifolia var. magna (N)
Calendula officinalis (I)
Calla palustris (N)
Callitriche heterophylla ssp. heterophylla (N)
Callitriche palustris (N)
Callitriche terrestris (N)
Calluna vulgaris (I)
Calopogon tuberosus var. tuberosus (N)
Caltha palustris var. palustris (N)
Calycanthus floridus var. glaucus (N)
Calystegia hederacea (I)
Calystegia sepium ssp. americana (N)
Calystegia sepium ssp. angulata (N)
Calystegia sepium ssp. sepium (I)
Calystegia silvatica (I)
Calystegia silvatica ssp. fraterniflora (N)
Calystegia spithamaea ssp. spithamaea (N)
Camassia scilloides (N)
Camelina microcarpa (I)
Camelina sativa ssp. sativa (I)
Campanula aparinoides (N)
Campanula rapunculoides (I)
Campanula rotundifolia (N)
Campanula trachelium (I)
Campanulastrum americanum (N)
Campsis radicans (N)
Cannabis sativa ssp. sativa var. sativa (I)
Capsella bursa-pastoris (I)
Cardamine angustata (N)
Cardamine bulbifera (I)
Cardamine bulbosa (N)
Cardamine concatenata (N)
Cardamine diphylla (N)
Cardamine dissecta (N)
Cardamine douglassii (N)
Cardamine flexuosa (I)
Cardamine hirsuta (I)
Cardamine impatiens (I)
Cardamine maxima (N)
Cardamine parviflora var. arenicola (N)
Cardamine pensylvanica (N)
Cardamine pratensis var. pratensis (N)
Cardamine rotundifolia (N)
Cardaria draba (I)
Cardiospermum halicacabum (I)
Carduus acanthoides (I)
Carduus crispus (I)
Carduus nutans (I)
Carex aggregata (N)  --  
Carex alata (N)  --  broad-winged sedge
Carex albicans var. albicans (N)  --  whitetinge sedge
Carex albicans var. emmonsii (N)  --  whitetinge sedge
Carex albolutescens (N)  --  greenish-white sedge
Carex albursina (N)  --  White Bear sedge
Carex alopecoidea (N)  --  foxtail sedge
Carex amphibola (N)  --  gray sedge
Carex annectens (N)  --  
Carex appalachica (N)  --  
Carex aquatilis var. aquatilis (N)  --  
Carex arctata (N)  --  
Carex argyrantha (N)  --  
Carex atherodes (N)  --  
Carex atlantica ssp. atlantica (N)  --  
Carex atlantica ssp. capillacea (N)  --  
Carex aurea (N)  --  
Carex bebbii (N)  --  
Carex bicknellii (N)  --  
Carex blanda (N)  --  
Carex brevior (N)  --  
Carex bromoides ssp. bromoides (N)  --  
Carex brunnescens ssp. sphaerostachya (N)  --  
Carex bushii (N)  --  
Carex buxbaumii (N)  --  
Carex canescens ssp. canescens (N)  --  
Carex canescens ssp. disjuncta (N)  --  
Carex careyana (N)  --  
Carex caroliniana (N)  --  
Carex cephaloidea (N)  --  
Carex cephalophora (N)  --  
Carex communis var. communis (N)  --  
Carex comosa (N)  --  
Carex conjuncta (N)  --  
Carex conoidea (N)  --  
Carex crawei (N)  --  
Carex crinita var. brevicrinis (N)  --  
Carex crinita var. crinita (N)  --  
Carex cristatella (N)  --  
Carex crus-corvi (N)  --  
Carex cryptolepis (N)  --  
Carex cumberlandensis (N)  --  
Carex davisii (N)  --  
Carex debilis var. debilis (N)  --  
Carex debilis var. rudgei (N)
Carex decomposita (N)
Carex deweyana var. deweyana (N)
Carex diandra (N)
Carex digitalis var. digitalis (N)
Carex disperma (N)
Carex eburnea (N)
Carex echinata ssp. echinata (N)
Carex emoryi (N)
Carex festucacea (N)
Carex flava (N)
Carex folliculata (N)
Carex formosa (N)
Carex frankii (N)
Carex garberi (N)
Carex glaucodea (N)
Carex gracilescens (N)
Carex gracillima (N)
Carex granularis (N)
Carex grayi (N)
Carex grisea (N)  --  
Carex gynandra (N)  --  
Carex haydenii (N)  --  
Carex hirsutella (N)  --  
Carex hirtifolia (N)  --  
Carex hitchcockiana (N)  --  
Carex hyalinolepis (N)  --  
Carex hystericina (N)  --  
Carex interior (N)  --  
Carex intumescens (N)  --  
Carex jamesii (N)  --  
Carex juniperorum (N)  --  
Carex lacustris (N)  --  
Carex laevivaginata (N)  --  
Carex lasiocarpa var. americana (N)  --  
Carex laxiculmis var. copulata (N)  --  
Carex laxiculmis var. laxiculmis (N)  --  
Carex laxiflora var. laxiflora (N)  --  
Carex leavenworthii (N)  --  
Carex leptalea ssp. leptalea (N)  --  
Carex leptonervia (N)  --  
Carex limosa (N)  --  
Carex longii (N)  --  
Carex louisianica (N)  --  
Carex lucorum var. lucorum (N)  --  
Carex lupuliformis (N)  --  
Carex lupulina (N)  --  
Carex lurida (N)  --  
Carex magellanica ssp. irrigua (N)  --  
Carex meadii (N)  --  
Carex merritt-fernaldii (N)  --  
Carex mesochorea (N)  --  
Carex molesta (N)
Carex muehlenbergii var. enervis (N)
Carex muehlenbergii var. muehlenbergii (N)
Carex muskingumensis (N)
Carex nigromarginata (N)
Carex normalis (N)
Carex oligocarpa (N)
Carex oligosperma var. oligosperma (N)
Carex pallescens (N)
Carex peckii (N)
Carex pedunculata (N)
Carex pellita (N)
Carex pensylvanica (N)
Carex planispicata (N)
Carex plantaginea (N)
Carex platyphylla (N)
Carex praegracilis (N)
Carex prairea (N)
Carex prasina (N)
Carex projecta (N)
Carex pseudocyperus (N)
Carex purpurifera (N)
Carex radiata (N)
Carex retroflexa (N)
Carex retrorsa (N)
Carex richardsonii (N)
Carex rosea (N)
Carex sartwellii var. sartwellii (N)
Carex scabrata (N)
Carex scoparia var. scoparia (N)
Carex seorsa (N)
Carex shortiana (N)
Carex siccata (N)
Carex sparganioides (N)
Carex spicata (I)
Carex sprengelii (N)
Carex squarrosa (N)
Carex sterilis (N)
Carex stipata var. maxima (N)
Carex stipata var. stipata (N)
Carex straminea (N)
Carex striatula (N)
Carex stricta (N)
Carex styloflexa (N)
Carex suberecta (N)
Carex × subimpressa (N)
Carex × sullivantii (N)
Carex swanii (N)
Carex tenera (N)
Carex tenuiflora (N)
Carex tetanica (N)
Carex texensis (N)
Carex timida (N)
Carex tonsa var. rugosperma (N)
Carex torta (N)
Carex tribuloides var. tribuloides (N)
Carex trichocarpa (N)
Carex trisperma var. trisperma (N)
Carex tuckermanii (N)
Carex typhina (N)
Carex umbellata (N)
Carex utriculata (N)
Carex vesicaria var. monile (N)
Carex virescens (N)
Carex viridula ssp. viridula (N)
Carex vulpinoidea var. vulpinoidea (N)
Carex willdenowii (N)
Carex woodii (N)
Carpinus caroliniana ssp. virginiana (N)
Carthamus tinctorius (I)
Carum carvi (I)
Carya alba (N)
Carya × brownii (N)
Carya cordiformis (N)
Carya glabra (N)
Carya illinoinensis (N)
Carya laciniosa (N)
Carya ovalis (N)
Carya ovata (N)
Castanea dentata (N)
Castanea pumila var. pumila (N)
Castilleja coccinea (N)
Catalpa bignonioides (N)
Catalpa ovata (I)
Catalpa speciosa (N)
Caulophyllum giganteum (N)
Caulophyllum thalictroides (N)
Ceanothus americanus (N)
Ceanothus herbaceus (N)
Celastrus orbiculatus (I)
Celastrus scandens (N)
Celosia argentea (I)
Celtis occidentalis (N)
Celtis tenuifolia (N)
Cenchrus longispinus (N)
Centaurea cyanus (I)
Centaurea diffusa (I)
Centaurea jacea (I)
Centaurea nigra (I)
Centaurea nigrescens (I)
Centaurea phrygia (I)
Centaurea scabiosa (I)
Centaurea solstitialis (I)
Centaurea stoebe ssp. micranthos (I)
Centaurea transalpina (N)
Centaurium erythraea (I)
Centaurium pulchellum (I)
Centella erecta (N)
Cephalanthus occidentalis (N)
Cerastium arvense (I)
Cerastium arvense ssp. strictum (N)
Cerastium arvense ssp. velutinum var. velutinum (N)
Cerastium arvense ssp. velutinum (N)
Cerastium brachypetalum (I)
Cerastium dubium (I)
Cerastium fontanum ssp. vulgare (I)
Cerastium glomeratum (I)
Cerastium nutans var. nutans (N)
Cerastium pumilum (I)
Cerastium semidecandrum (I)
Cerastium tomentosum (I)
Ceratocephala testiculata (I)
Ceratophyllum demersum (N)
Ceratophyllum echinatum (N)
Cercidiphyllum japonicum (I)
Cercis canadensis var. canadensis (N)
Chaenomeles speciosa (I)
Chaenorhinum minus (I)
Chaerophyllum procumbens var. procumbens (N)
Chaerophyllum procumbens var. shortii (N)
Chaerophyllum tainturieri var. tainturieri (N)
Chaiturus marrubiastrum (I)
Chamaecrista fasciculata var. fasciculata (N)
Chamaecrista nictitans ssp. nictitans var. nictitans (N)
Chamaecrista nictitans ssp. nictitans (N)
Chamaedaphne calyculata (N)
Chamaelirium luteum (N)
Chamaemelum mixtum (I)
Chamaemelum nobile (I)
Chamaesyce humistrata (N)
Chamaesyce maculata (N)
Chamaesyce nutans (N)
Chamaesyce polygonifolia (N)
Chamaesyce prostrata (N)
Chamaesyce serpens (N)
Chamaesyce vermiculata (N)
Chamerion angustifolium ssp. circumvagum (N)
Chasmanthium latifolium (N)
Chelidonium majus var. majus (I)
Chelone glabra (N)
Chenopodium album var. missouriense (N)
Chenopodium album var. album (I)
Chenopodium ambrosioides var. ambrosioides (I)
Chenopodium berlandieri var. bushianum (N)
Chenopodium berlandieri var. zschackii (N)
Chenopodium botrys (I)
Chenopodium capitatum (N)
Chenopodium glaucum (I)
Chenopodium glaucum (N)
Chenopodium humile (I)
Chenopodium humile (N)
Chenopodium incanum var. incanum (N)
Chenopodium murale (I)
Chenopodium polyspermum var. acutifolium (I)
Chenopodium pratericola (N)
Chenopodium pumilio (I)
Chenopodium simplex (N)
Chenopodium standleyanum (N)
Chenopodium subglabrum (N)
Chenopodium urbicum (I)
Chenopodium vulvaria (I)
Chimaphila maculata (N)
Chimaphila umbellata ssp. cisatlantica (N)
Chionanthus virginicus (N)
Chloris verticillata (N)
Chloris virgata (N)
Chorispora tenella (I)
Chrysanthemum × morifolium (I)
Chrysogonum virginianum var. virginianum (N)
Chrysopsis mariana (N)
Chrysosplenium americanum (N)
Cichorium intybus (I)
Cicuta bulbifera (N)
Cicuta maculata var. maculata (N)
Cinna arundinacea (N)
Cinna latifolia (N)
Circaea alpina ssp. alpina (N)
Circaea × intermedia (N)
Circaea lutetiana ssp. canadensis (N)
Cirsium arvense (I)  --   creeping thistle
Cirsium canescens (N)  --  Platte thistle, prairie thistle
Cirsium carolinianum (N)  --  Carolina thistle, soft thistle
Cirsium discolor (N)  --  field thistle, pasture thistle
Cirsium muticum (N)  --  swamp thistle
Cirsium pumilum (N)  --  pasture thistle
Cirsium vulgare (I)  --  spear thistle, bull thistle, or common thistle
Citrullus lanatus var. lanatus (I)
Cladium mariscoides (N)
Cladrastis kentukea (N)
Clarkia pulchella (N)
Claytonia caroliniana var. caroliniana (N)
Claytonia virginica var. virginica (N)
Clematis occidentalis var. occidentalis (N)
Clematis terniflora (I)
Clematis viorna (N)
Clematis virginiana (N)
Cleome hassleriana (I)
Cleome serrulata (N)
Clinopodium arkansanum (N)
Clinopodium vulgare (N)
Clintonia borealis (N)
Clintonia umbellulata (N)
Clitoria mariana (N)
Coix lacryma-jobi (I)
Collinsia verna (N)
Collinsonia canadensis (N)
Collinsonia verticillata (N)
Collomia linearis (N)
Colutea arborescens (I)
Comandra umbellata ssp. umbellata (N)
Comarum palustre (N)
Commelina communis (I)
Commelina diffusa var. diffusa (N)
Commelina virginica (N)
Comptonia peregrina (N)
Conioselinum chinense (N)
Conium maculatum (I)
Conoclinium coelestinum (N)
Conopholis americana (N)
Conringia orientalis (I)
Consolida ajacis (I)
Consolida regalis (I)
Convallaria majalis (I)
Convolvulus arvensis (I)
Conyza canadensis var. canadensis (N)
Conyza canadensis var. pusilla (N)
Conyza ramosissima (N)
Coptis trifolia (N)
Corallorhiza maculata var. maculata (N)
Corallorhiza odontorhiza var. odontorhiza (N)
Corallorhiza trifida (N)
Corallorhiza wisteriana (N)
Coreopsis grandiflora var. harveyana (N)  --  large-flowered tickseed
Coreopsis lanceolata (N)  --  lance-leaved tickseed
Coreopsis major (N)  --  
Coreopsis tinctoria var. tinctoria (N)  --  golden tickseed
Coreopsis verticillata (N)  --  whorled tickseed
Coriandrum sativum (I)
Corispermum americanum var. americanum (N)
Corispermum pallasii (I)
Corispermum pallasii (N)
Cornus alternifolia (N)
Cornus amomum (N)
Cornus × arnoldiana (N)
Cornus canadensis (N)
Cornus drummondii (N)
Cornus florida (N)
Cornus obliqua (N)
Cornus racemosa (N)
Cornus rugosa (N)
Cornus sericea ssp. sericea (N)
Coronilla scorpioides (I)
Coronopus didymus (I)
Corydalis aurea (N)
Corydalis flavula (N)
Corydalis sempervirens (N)
Corylus americana (N)
Corylus cornuta var. cornuta (N)
Cosmos bipinnatus (I)
Cotinus coggygria (I)
Cotoneaster divaricatus (I)
Cotoneaster simonsii (I)
Crataegus × anomala (N)
Crataegus apiomorpha (N)
Crataegus arborea (N)
Crataegus ater (N)
Crataegus beata (N)
Crataegus brainerdii (N)
Crataegus calpodendron (N)
Crataegus chrysocarpa var. chrysocarpa (N)
Crataegus coleae (N)
Crataegus compacta (N)
Crataegus compta (N)
Crataegus corusca (N)
Crataegus crus-galli (N)
Crataegus disperma (N)
Crataegus dissona (N)
Crataegus engelmannii (N)
Crataegus flabellata (N)  --  fanleaf hawthorn
Crataegus holmesiana (N)
Crataegus × hudsonica (N)
Crataegus × immanis (N)
Crataegus indicens (N)
Crataegus intricata (N)
Crataegus iracunda (N)  --  passionate hawthorn
Crataegus irrasa (N)
Crataegus jesupii (N)
Crataegus lucorum (N)
Crataegus macrosperma (N)  --  bigfruit hawthorn
Crataegus margarettiae (N)
Crataegus mollis (N)
Crataegus monogyna (I)
Crataegus nitida (N)
Crataegus pedicellata (N)
Crataegus pennsylvanica (N)
Crataegus persimilis (N)
Crataegus phaenopyrum (N)
Crataegus pringlei (N)
Crataegus prona (N)
Crataegus pruinosa (N)
Crataegus punctata (N)
Crataegus scabrida (N)
Crataegus schuettei (N)  --  royal hawthorn
Crataegus submollis (N)
Crataegus suborbiculata (N)
Crataegus succulenta (N)
Crataegus tanuphylla (N)
Crataegus uniflora (N)
Crepis biennis (I)
Crepis capillaris (I)
Crepis nicaeensis (I)
Crepis pulchra (I)
Crepis setosa (I)
Crepis tectorum (I)
Crotalaria sagittalis (N)
Croton capitatus var. capitatus (N)
Croton glandulosus var. septentrionalis (N)
Croton monanthogynus (N)
Cruciata pedemontana (I)
Crypsis schoenoides (I)
Cryptotaenia canadensis (N)
Cucumis melo (I)
Cucumis sativus (I)
Cucurbita foetidissima (N)
Cucurbita maxima (I)
Cucurbita pepo (N)
Cucurbita pepo var. pepo (I)
Cunila origanoides (N)
Cuphea viscosissima (N)
Cuscuta cephalanthi (N)
Cuscuta compacta var. compacta (N)
Cuscuta coryli (N)
Cuscuta epilinum (I)
Cuscuta epithymum (I)
Cuscuta glomerata (N)
Cuscuta gronovii var. gronovii (N)
Cuscuta pentagona var. pentagona (N)
Cuscuta polygonorum (N)
Cuscuta suaveolens (I)
Cyclachaena xanthifolia (N)
Cycloloma atriplicifolium (N)
Cydonia oblonga (I)
Cymbalaria muralis (I)
Cynanchum laeve (N)
Cynanchum louiseae (I)
Cynodon dactylon (I)
Cynoglossum officinale (I)
Cynoglossum virginianum var. boreale (N)
Cynoglossum virginianum var. virginianum (N)
Cynosurus cristatus (I)
Cynosurus echinatus (I)
Cyperus acuminatus (N)  --  tapertip flatsedge
Cyperus amuricus (I)
Cyperus bipartitus (N)  --  slender flatsedge, river cyperus
Cyperus compressus (N)  --  annual sedge
Cyperus diandrus (N)
Cyperus echinatus (N)
Cyperus erythrorhizos (N)  --  redroot flatsedge
Cyperus esculentus (N)  --  tiger nut, atadwe, yellow nutsedge, and earth almond
Cyperus esculentus var. leptostachyus (I)
Cyperus flavescens (N)
Cyperus houghtonii (N)
Cyperus iria (I)  --  rice flat sedge
Cyperus lancastriensis (N)  --  
Cyperus lupulinus ssp. lupulinus (N)  --  Great Plains flatsedge
Cyperus lupulinus ssp. macilentus (N)
Cyperus odoratus (N)  --  fragrant flatsedge
Cyperus refractus (N)
Cyperus retrofractus (N)
Cyperus schweinitzii (N)
Cyperus squarrosus (N)  --  bearded flatsedge
Cyperus strigosus (N)  --   false nutsedge and straw-colored flatsedge
Cypripedium acaule (N)
Cypripedium × andrewsii var. andrewsii (N)
Cypripedium × andrewsii var. landonii (N)
Cypripedium candidum (N)
Cypripedium parviflorum var. parviflorum (N)
Cypripedium parviflorum var. pubescens (N)
Cypripedium reginae (N)
Cyrtomium falcatum (I)
Cystopteris bulbifera (N)
Cystopteris fragilis (N)
Cystopteris × illinoensis (N)
Cystopteris protrusa (N)
Cystopteris tennesseensis (N)
Cystopteris tenuis (N)
Cystopteris × wagneri (N)
Cytisus scoparius var. scoparius (I)

D 
Dactylis glomerata ssp. glomerata (I)
Dactyloctenium aegyptium (I)
Dactylorhiza viridis (N)
Dalea leporina (N)
Dalea purpurea var. purpurea (N)
Dalibarda repens (N)
Danthonia compressa (N)
Danthonia spicata (N)
Daphne mezereum (I)
Dasiphora fruticosa ssp. floribunda (N)
Dasistoma macrophylla (N)
Datura stramonium (I)
Datura wrightii (N)
Daucus carota (I)
Decodon verticillatus (N)
Delphinium exaltatum (N)
Delphinium tricorne (N)
Dennstaedtia punctilobula (N)
Deparia acrostichoides (N)
Deschampsia cespitosa (N)
Deschampsia danthonioides (N)
Deschampsia flexuosa var. flexuosa (N)
Descurainia pinnata ssp. brachycarpa (N)
Descurainia sophia (I)
Desmanthus illinoensis (N)
Desmodium canadense (N)
Desmodium canescens (N)
Desmodium ciliare var. ciliare (N)
Desmodium cuspidatum var. cuspidatum (N)
Desmodium cuspidatum var. longifolium (N)
Desmodium glutinosum (N)
Desmodium illinoense (N)
Desmodium laevigatum (N)
Desmodium marilandicum (N)
Desmodium nudiflorum (N)
Desmodium obtusum (N)
Desmodium paniculatum var. paniculatum (N)
Desmodium pauciflorum (N)
Desmodium perplexum (N)
Desmodium rotundifolium (N)
Desmodium sessilifolium (N)
Desmodium viridiflorum (N)
Dianthus armeria (I)
Dianthus barbatus (I)
Dianthus deltoides (I)
Dianthus plumarius (I)
Diarrhena americana (N)
Diarrhena obovata (N)
Dicentra canadensis (N)
Dicentra cucullaria (N)
Dicentra eximia (N)
Dichanthelium acuminatum var. acuminatum (N)
Dichanthelium acuminatum var. fasciculatum (N)
Dichanthelium acuminatum var. lindheimeri (N)
Dichanthelium boreale (N)
Dichanthelium boscii (N)
Dichanthelium clandestinum (N)
Dichanthelium commutatum (N)
Dichanthelium depauperatum (N)
Dichanthelium dichotomum var. dichotomum (N)
Dichanthelium latifolium (N)
Dichanthelium laxiflorum (N)
Dichanthelium leibergii (N)
Dichanthelium linearifolium (N)
Dichanthelium longiligulatum (N)
Dichanthelium meridionale (N)
Dichanthelium oligosanthes var. oligosanthes (N)
Dichanthelium oligosanthes var. scribnerianum (N)
Dichanthelium ovale var. addisonii (N)
Dichanthelium sabulorum var. patulum (N)
Dichanthelium sabulorum var. thinium (N)
Dichanthelium sphaerocarpon var. isophyllum (N)
Dichanthelium sphaerocarpon var. sphaerocarpon (N)
Dichanthelium spretum (N)
Dichanthelium villosissimum var. praecocius (N)
Dichondra carolinensis (N)
Diervilla lonicera (N)
Digitalis grandiflora (I)
Digitalis lanata (I)
Digitalis lutea (I)
Digitalis purpurea ssp. purpurea (I)
Digitaria ciliaris (N)
Digitaria cognata (N)
Digitaria filiformis (N)
Digitaria ischaemum (I)
Digitaria sanguinalis (N)
Diodia teres var. teres (N)
Diodia virginiana var. virginiana (N)
Dioscorea polystachya (I)
Dioscorea quaternata (N)
Dioscorea villosa (N)
Diospyros virginiana (N)
Diplazium pycnocarpon (N)
Diplotaxis muralis (I)
Diplotaxis tenuifolia (I)
Dipsacus fullonum (I)
Dipsacus laciniatus (I)
Dipsacus sativus (I)
Dirca palustris (N)
Distichlis spicata (N)
Dodecatheon meadia ssp. meadia (N)
Doellingeria infirma (N)
Doellingeria umbellata var. umbellata (N)
Draba brachycarpa (N)
Draba cuneifolia var. cuneifolia (N)
Draba reptans (N)
Draba verna (I)
Dracocephalum parviflorum (N)
Drosera intermedia (N)
Drosera rotundifolia var. rotundifolia (N)
Dryopteris × benedictii (N)
Dryopteris × boottii (N)
Dryopteris carthusiana (N)
Dryopteris clintoniana (N)
Dryopteris cristata (N)
Dryopteris goldieana (N)
Dryopteris intermedia (N)
Dryopteris marginalis (N)
Dryopteris × mickelii (N)
Dryopteris × neowherryi (N)
Dryopteris × pittsfordensis (N)
Dryopteris × slossoniae (N)
Dryopteris × triploidea (N)
Dryopteris × uliginosa (N)
Duchesnea indica (I)
Dulichium arundinaceum var. arundinaceum (N)
Dyssodia papposa (N)

E 
Echinacea purpurea (N)
Echinochloa crus-galli (I)
Echinochloa frumentacea (I)
Echinochloa muricata var. microstachya (N)
Echinochloa muricata var. muricata (N)
Echinochloa walteri (N)
Echinocystis lobata (N)
Echinodorus berteroi (N)
Echium vulgare (I)
Eclipta prostrata (N)
Egeria densa (I)
Elaeagnus angustifolia (I)
Elaeagnus multiflora (I)
Elaeagnus umbellata var. parvifolia (I)
Elatine brachysperma (N)
Eleocharis acicularis var. acicularis (N)
Eleocharis compressa var. compressa (N)
Eleocharis elliptica (N)
Eleocharis engelmannii (N)
Eleocharis erythropoda (N)
Eleocharis geniculata (N)
Eleocharis intermedia (N)
Eleocharis obtusa (N)
Eleocharis olivacea var. olivacea (N)
Eleocharis ovata (N)
Eleocharis palustris var. palustris (N)
Eleocharis parvula (N)
Eleocharis quadrangulata (N)
Eleocharis quinqueflora (N)
Eleocharis rostellata (N)
Eleocharis tenuis var. tenuis (N)
Eleocharis tenuis var. verrucosa (N)
Eleocharis wolfii (N)
Elephantopus carolinianus (N)
Eleusine indica (I)
Ellisia nyctelea (N)
Elodea canadensis (N)
Elodea nuttallii (N)
Elymus canadensis (N)
Elymus hystrix var. bigeloviana (N)
Elymus hystrix var. hystrix (N)
Elymus repens (I)
Elymus riparius (N)
Elymus submuticus (N)
Elymus trachycaulus ssp. subsecundus (N)
Elymus trachycaulus ssp. trachycaulus (N)
Elymus villosus (N)
Elymus virginicus var. virginicus (N)
Enemion biternatum (N)
Epifagus virginiana (N)
Epigaea repens (N)
Epilobium ciliatum ssp. ciliatum (N)
Epilobium ciliatum ssp. glandulosum (N)
Epilobium coloratum (N)
Epilobium hirsutum (I)
Epilobium leptophyllum (N)
Epilobium parviflorum (I)
Epilobium strictum (N)
Epilobium × wisconsinense (N)
Epipactis helleborine (I)
Equisetum arvense (N)
Equisetum × ferrissii (N)
Equisetum fluviatile (N)
Equisetum hyemale var. affine (N)
Equisetum laevigatum (N)
Equisetum × mackaii (N)
Equisetum × nelsonii (N)
Equisetum sylvaticum (N)
Equisetum variegatum var. variegatum (N)
Eragrostis capillaris (N)
Eragrostis cilianensis (I)
Eragrostis curvula (I)
Eragrostis frankii (N)
Eragrostis hirsuta (N)
Eragrostis hypnoides (N)
Eragrostis minor (I)
Eragrostis pectinacea var. miserrima (N)
Eragrostis pectinacea var. pectinacea (N)
Eragrostis pilosa (N)
Eragrostis spectabilis (N)
Eragrostis trichodes (N)
Eranthis hyemalis (I)
Erechtites hieraciifolia var. hieraciifolia (N)
Erica tetralix (I)
Erigenia bulbosa (N)
Erigeron annuus (N)
Erigeron philadelphicus var. philadelphicus (N)
Erigeron pulchellus var. brauniae (N)
Erigeron pulchellus var. pulchellus (N)
Erigeron strigosus var. strigosus (N)
Eriocaulon aquaticum (N)
Eriochloa contracta (N)
Eriophorum gracile var. gracile (N)
Eriophorum virginicum (N)
Eriophorum viridicarinatum (N)
Erodium cicutarium ssp. cicutarium (I)
Erucastrum gallicum (I)
Eryngium yuccifolium var. yuccifolium (N)
Erysimum capitatum var. capitatum (N)
Erysimum cheiranthoides (I)
Erysimum inconspicuum var. inconspicuum (N)
Erysimum repandum (I)
Erythronium albidum (N)
Erythronium americanum ssp. americanum (N)
Erythronium rostratum (N)
Eschscholzia californica ssp. californica (N)
Eubotrys recurva (N)
Euonymus alatus var. alatus (I)
Euonymus americanus (N)
Euonymus atropurpureus var. atropurpureus (N)
Euonymus europaeus (I)
Euonymus fortunei var. radicans (I)
Euonymus obovatus (N)
Eupatoriadelphus fistulosus (N)
Eupatoriadelphus maculatus var. maculatus (N)
Eupatorium album var. album (N)
Eupatorium altissimum (N)
Eupatorium godfreyanum (N) (a hybrid of Eupatorium rotundifolium and Eupatorium sessilifolium)
Eupatorium hyssopifolium var. laciniatum (N)
Eupatorium perfoliatum var. perfoliatum (N)
Eupatorium purpureum var. purpureum (N)
Eupatorium rotundifolium var. ovatum (N)
Eupatorium rotundifolium var. rotundifolium (N)
Eupatorium serotinum (N)
Eupatorium sessilifolium var. sessilifolium (N)
Euphorbia commutata (N)
Euphorbia corollata (N)
Euphorbia cyathophora (N)
Euphorbia cyparissias (I)
Euphorbia davidii (I)
Euphorbia dentata (I)
Euphorbia dentata var. dentata (N)
Euphorbia esula var. esula (I)
Euphorbia falcata (I)
Euphorbia helioscopia (I)
Euphorbia lathyris (I)
Euphorbia marginata (N)
Euphorbia peplus (I)
Euphorbia platyphyllos (I)
Euphorbia purpurea (N)
Euphorbia spathulata (N)
Eurybia divaricata (N)
Eurybia macrophylla (N)
Eurybia schreberi (N)
Eurybia surculosa (N)
Euthamia graminifolia var. graminifolia (N)
Euthamia gymnospermoides (N)

F 
Fagopyrum esculentum (I)
Fagus grandifolia (N)
Fagus sylvatica (I)
Fatoua villosa (I)
Festuca brevipila (I)
Festuca filiformis (I)
Festuca rubra (I)
Festuca rubra ssp. rubra (N)
Festuca subverticillata (N)
Filago vulgaris (I)
Filipendula rubra (N)
Filipendula ulmaria ssp. ulmaria (I)
Fimbristylis autumnalis (N)
Fleischmannia incarnata (N)
Floerkea proserpinacoides (N)
Foeniculum vulgare (I)
Fontanesia phillyreoides ssp. fortunei (I)
Forsythia × intermedia (I)
Forsythia suspensa (I)
Fragaria vesca ssp. americana (N)
Fragaria vesca ssp. vesca (N)
Fragaria virginiana ssp. grayana (N)
Fragaria virginiana ssp. virginiana (N)
Frangula alnus (I)
Frangula alnus (N)
Frangula caroliniana (N)
Frasera caroliniensis (N)
Fraxinus americana (N)
Fraxinus excelsior (I)
Fraxinus nigra (N)
Fraxinus pennsylvanica (N)
Fraxinus profunda (N)
Fraxinus quadrangulata (N)
Froelichia floridana var. campestris (N)
Froelichia gracilis (N)
Fumaria officinalis ssp. officinalis (I)

G 
Gaillardia pulchella var. pulchella (N)
Galactia volubilis (N)
Galanthus elwesii (I)
Galanthus nivalis (I)
Galax urceolata (N)
Galearis spectabilis (N)
Galeopsis bifida (I)
Galeopsis ladanum var. ladanum (I)
Galeopsis tetrahit var. tetrahit (I)
Galinsoga parviflora (I)
Galinsoga quadriradiata (I)
Galium aparine (N)
Galium asprellum (N)
Galium boreale (N)
Galium circaezans var. hypomalacum (N)
Galium concinnum (N)
Galium labradoricum (N)
Galium lanceolatum (N)
Galium mollugo (I)
Galium obtusum ssp. obtusum (N)
Galium odoratum (I)
Galium palustre (N)
Galium pilosum var. pilosum (N)
Galium tinctorium (N)
Galium trifidum ssp. trifidum (N)
Galium triflorum (N)
Galium verum var. verum (I)
Gamochaeta purpurea (N)
Gaultheria hispidula (N)
Gaultheria procumbens (N)
Gaura biennis (N)
Gaura longiflora (N)
Gaura mollis (N)
Gaylussacia baccata (N)
Genista tinctoria (I)
Gentiana alba (N)
Gentiana andrewsii var. andrewsii (N)
Gentiana × billingtonii (N)
Gentiana clausa (N)
Gentiana puberulenta (N)
Gentiana saponaria var. saponaria (N)
Gentiana villosa (N)
Gentianella quinquefolia ssp. occidentalis (N)
Gentianopsis crinita (N)
Gentianopsis virgata ssp. victorinii (N)
Gentianopsis virgata ssp. virgata (N)
Geranium bicknellii (N)
Geranium carolinianum var. carolinianum (N)
Geranium columbinum (I)
Geranium dissectum (I)
Geranium maculatum (N)
Geranium molle (I)
Geranium pusillum (I)
Geranium robertianum (I)
Geranium robertianum ssp. robertianum (N)
Geranium sanguineum (I)
Geum aleppicum (N)
Geum canadense var. canadense (N)
Geum laciniatum var. laciniatum (N)
Geum rivale (N)
Geum urbanum (I)
Geum vernum (N)
Geum virginianum (N)
Gilia capitata ssp. capitata (N)
Gillenia stipulata (N)
Gillenia trifoliata (N)
Gladiolus × gandavensis (I)
Glandularia canadensis (N)
Glandularia × hybrida (I)
Glebionis segetum (I)
Glechoma hederacea (I)
Gleditsia triacanthos (N)
Glyceria acutiflora (N)
Glyceria borealis (N)
Glyceria canadensis (N)
Glyceria grandis var. grandis (N)
Glyceria melicaria (N)
Glyceria septentrionalis (N)
Glyceria striata (N)
Glycine max (I)
Gnaphalium uliginosum (I)
Gomphrena globosa (I)
Goodyera pubescens (N)
Goodyera repens (N)
Goodyera tesselata (N)
Gratiola neglecta (N)
Gratiola virginiana var. virginiana (N)
Gratiola viscidula (N)
Grindelia lanceolata var. lanceolata (N)
Grindelia squarrosa var. serrulata (N)
Grindelia squarrosa var. squarrosa (N)
Guizotia abyssinica (I)
Gutierrezia texana var. texana (N)
Gymnocarpium appalachianum (N)
Gymnocarpium × brittonianum (N)
Gymnocarpium dryopteris (N)
Gymnocladus dioicus (N)
Gymnopogon ambiguus (N)
Gypsophila paniculata (I)
Gypsophila scorzonerifolia (I)

H 
Hackelia deflexa var. americana (N)
Hackelia virginiana (N)
Halesia tetraptera var. tetraptera (N)
Hamamelis virginiana (N)
Hasteola suaveolens (N)
Hedeoma hispida (N)
Hedeoma pulegioides (N)
Hedera helix (I)
Helenium amarum var. amarum (N)
Helenium autumnale var. autumnale (N)
Helenium flexuosum (N)
Helianthemum bicknellii (N)
Helianthemum canadense (N)
Helianthus × ambiguus (N)
Helianthus angustifolius (N)
Helianthus annuus (N)
Helianthus × brevifolius (N)
Helianthus × cinereus (N)
Helianthus decapetalus (N)
Helianthus divaricatus (N)
Helianthus × divariserratus (N)
Helianthus × doronicoides (N)
Helianthus giganteus (N)
Helianthus × glaucus (N)
Helianthus grosseserratus (N)
Helianthus hirsutus (N)
Helianthus × intermedius (N)
Helianthus × kellermanii (N)
Helianthus × laetiflorus (N)
Helianthus × luxurians (N)
Helianthus maximiliani (N)
Helianthus microcephalus (N)
Helianthus mollis (N)
Helianthus × multiflorus (N)
Helianthus occidentalis ssp. occidentalis (N)
Helianthus petiolaris ssp. petiolaris (N)
Helianthus salicifolius (N)
Helianthus strumosus (N)
Helianthus tuberosus (N)
Heliopsis helianthoides var. helianthoides (N)
Heliopsis helianthoides var. occidentalis (N)
Heliotropium europaeum (I)
Heliotropium indicum (I)
Helleborus viridis (I)
Hemerocallis fulva (I)
Hemerocallis lilioasphodelus (I)
Hepatica nobilis var. acuta (N)
Hepatica nobilis var. obtusa (N)
Heracleum maximum (N)
Hesperis matronalis (I)
Hesperostipa spartea (N)
Heteranthera dubia (N)
Heteranthera reniformis (N)
Heterotheca camporum var. camporum (N)
Heuchera americana var. americana (N)
Heuchera americana var. hirsuticaulis (N)
Heuchera americana var. hispida (N)
Heuchera longiflora (N)
Heuchera parviflora var. parviflora (N)
Heuchera villosa var. villosa (N)
Hexalectris spicata var. spicata (N)
Hibiscus laevis (N)
Hibiscus moscheutos (N)
Hibiscus syriacus (I)
Hibiscus trionum (I)
Hieracium aurantiacum (I)
Hieracium caespitosum (I)
Hieracium × flagellare var. flagellare (I)
Hieracium × floribundum (I)
Hieracium greenii (N)
Hieracium gronovii (N)
Hieracium kalmii var. fasciculatum (N)
Hieracium kalmii var. kalmii (N)
Hieracium longipilum (N)
Hieracium paniculatum (N)
Hieracium pilosella var. pilosella (I)
Hieracium piloselloides (I)
Hieracium scabrum var. scabrum (N)
Hieracium venosum (N)
Hierochloe hirta ssp. arctica (N)
Holcus lanatus (I)
Holosteum umbellatum (I)
Hordeum brachyantherum ssp. brachyantherum (N)
Hordeum jubatum ssp. jubatum (N)
Hordeum marinum ssp. gussonianum (I)
Hordeum pusillum (N)
Hordeum vulgare (I)
Hosta lancifolia (I)
Hosta ventricosa (I)
Hottonia inflata (N)
Houstonia caerulea (N)
Houstonia canadensis (N)
Houstonia longifolia (N)
Houstonia purpurea var. calycosa (N)
Houstonia purpurea var. purpurea (N)
Hudsonia tomentosa var. tomentosa (N)
Humulus japonicus (I)
Humulus lupulus var. lupuloides (N)
Humulus lupulus var. pubescens (N)
Humulus lupulus var. lupulus (I)
Huperzia × bartleyi (N)
Huperzia × buttersii (N)
Huperzia lucidula (N)
Huperzia porophila (N)
Hyacinthoides non-scripta (I)
Hybanthus concolor (N)
Hydrangea arborescens (N)
Hydrastis canadensis (N)
Hydrocotyle americana (N)
Hydrocotyle ranunculoides (N)
Hydrocotyle sibthorpioides (I)
Hydrocotyle umbellata (N)
Hydrophyllum appendiculatum (N)
Hydrophyllum canadense (N)
Hydrophyllum macrophyllum (N)
Hydrophyllum virginianum var. virginianum (N)
Hylotelephium telephioides (N)
Hylotelephium telephium ssp. telephium (I)
Hypericum ascyron (N)
Hypericum boreale (N)
Hypericum canadense (N)
Hypericum drummondii (N)
Hypericum ellipticum (N)
Hypericum gentianoides (N)
Hypericum gymnanthum (N)
Hypericum hypericoides ssp. multicaule (N)
Hypericum kalmianum (N)
Hypericum majus (N)
Hypericum mutilum (N)
Hypericum perforatum (I)
Hypericum prolificum (N)
Hypericum punctatum (N)
Hypericum sphaerocarpum (N)
Hypericum virgatum (N)
Hypochaeris glabra (I)
Hypochaeris radicata (I)
Hypoxis hirsuta (N)

I 
Iberis umbellata (I)
Ilex crenata (I)
Ilex mucronata (N)
Ilex opaca var. opaca (N)
Ilex verticillata (N)
Impatiens balsamina (I)
Impatiens capensis (N)
Impatiens pallida (N)
Inula helenium (I)
Iodanthus pinnatifidus (N)
Ionactis linariifolius (N)
Ipomoea coccinea (I)
Ipomoea hederacea (I)
Ipomoea lacunosa (N)
Ipomoea pandurata (N)
Ipomoea purpurea (I)
Ipomopsis rubra (N)
Iris brevicaulis (N)
Iris cristata (N)
Iris fulva (N)
Iris germanica (I)
Iris pseudacorus (I)
Iris verna var. smalliana (N)
Iris versicolor (N)
Iris virginica var. shrevei (N)
Isoetes appalachiana (N)
Isoetes engelmannii (N)
Isoetes tenella (N)
Isotria medeoloides (N)
Isotria verticillata (N)
Iva annua var. annua (N)

J 
Jacquemontia tamnifolia (N)
Jeffersonia diphylla (N)
Juglans cinerea (N)
Juglans nigra (N)
Juncus acuminatus (N)
Juncus alpinoarticulatus ssp. nodulosus (N)
Juncus anthelatus (N)
Juncus arcticus ssp. littoralis (N)
Juncus articulatus (N)
Juncus biflorus (N)
Juncus brachycarpus (N)
Juncus brachycephalus (N)
Juncus bufonius var. bufonius (N)
Juncus canadensis (N)
Juncus compressus (I)
Juncus dichotomus (N)
Juncus diffusissimus (N)
Juncus dudleyi (N)
Juncus effusus var. decipiens (N)
Juncus effusus var. pylaei (N)
Juncus effusus var. solutus (N)
Juncus gerardii var. gerardii (N)
Juncus greenei (N)
Juncus interior var. interior (N)
Juncus marginatus (N)
Juncus nodosus var. nodosus (N)
Juncus secundus (N)
Juncus × stuckeyi (N)
Juncus subcaudatus var. subcaudatus (N)
Juncus tenuis (N)
Juncus torreyi (N)
Juniperus communis var. depressa (N)
Juniperus virginiana var. virginiana (N)
Justicia americana (N)

K 
Kalmia latifolia (N)
Kerria japonica (I)
Kickxia elatine (I)
Kickxia spuria (I)
Koeleria macrantha (N)
Koelreuteria paniculata (I)
Krigia biflora var. biflora (N)
Krigia dandelion (N)
Krigia virginica (N)
Kummerowia stipulacea (I)
Kummerowia striata (I)
Kyllinga pumila (N)

L 
Lablab purpureus (I)
Lactuca biennis (N)
Lactuca canadensis (N)
Lactuca floridana var. floridana (N)
Lactuca floridana var. villosa (N)
Lactuca hirsuta var. sanguinea (N)
Lactuca × morssii (N)
Lactuca saligna (I)
Lactuca sativa (I)
Lactuca serriola (I)
Lactuca tatarica var. pulchella (N)
Lamium album (I)
Lamium amplexicaule (I)
Lamium maculatum (I)
Lamium purpureum var. purpureum (I)
Laportea canadensis (N)
Lappula squarrosa (I)
Lapsana communis (I)
Larix laricina (N)
Lathyrus japonicus var. maritimus (N)
Lathyrus japonicus var. parviflorus (N)
Lathyrus latifolius (I)
Lathyrus ochroleucus (N)
Lathyrus odoratus (I)
Lathyrus palustris (N)
Lathyrus pratensis (I)
Lathyrus tuberosus (I)
Lathyrus venosus (N)
Leavenworthia uniflora (N)
Lechea intermedia var. intermedia (N)
Lechea minor (N)
Lechea mucronata (N)
Lechea pulchella var. moniliformis (N)
Lechea pulchella var. pulchella (N)
Lechea racemulosa (N)
Lechea tenuifolia (N)
Ledum groenlandicum (N)
Leersia lenticularis (N)
Leersia oryzoides (N)
Leersia virginica (N)
Lemna minor (N)
Lemna minuta (N)
Lemna obscura (N)
Lemna perpusilla (N)
Lemna trisulca (N)
Lemna turionifera (N)
Lemna valdiviana (N)
Leontodon autumnalis ssp. autumnalis (I)
Leontodon autumnalis ssp. pratensis (I)
Leontodon hispidus ssp. danubialis (I)
Leontodon taraxacoides ssp. taraxacoides (I)
Leonurus cardiaca ssp. cardiaca (I)
Leonurus sibiricus (I)
Lepidium campestre (I)
Lepidium densiflorum var. densiflorum (N)
Lepidium perfoliatum (I)
Lepidium ramosissimum var. bourgeauanum (N)
Lepidium ruderale (I)
Lepidium sativum (I)
Lepidium virginicum var. virginicum (N)
Leptochloa fusca ssp. fascicularis (N)
Leptochloa panicea ssp. brachiata (N)
Lespedeza × acuticarpa (N)
Lespedeza bicolor (I)
Lespedeza × brittonii (N)
Lespedeza capitata (N)
Lespedeza cuneata (I)
Lespedeza formosa (I)
Lespedeza frutescens (N)
Lespedeza hirta ssp. hirta (N)
Lespedeza × nuttallii (N)
Lespedeza procumbens (N)
Lespedeza repens (N)
Lespedeza thunbergii (I)
Lespedeza violacea (N)
Lespedeza virginica (N)
Lesquerella globosa (N)
Leucanthemum maximum (I)
Leucanthemum vulgare (I)
Leucojum aestivum ssp. aestivum (I)
Leucospora multifida (N)
Levisticum officinale (I)
Liatris aspera var. aspera (N)
Liatris aspera var. intermedia (N)
Liatris cylindracea (N)
Liatris punctata var. punctata (N)
Liatris pycnostachya var. pycnostachya (N)
Liatris scariosa var. nieuwlandii (N)
Liatris spheroidea (N)
Liatris spicata var. spicata (N)
Liatris squarrosa var. squarrosa (N)
Liatris squarrulosa (N)
Ligusticum canadense (N)
Ligustrum obtusifolium (I)
Ligustrum ovalifolium (I)
Ligustrum vulgare (I)
Lilium canadense ssp. canadense (N)
Lilium canadense ssp. editorum (N)
Lilium lancifolium (I)
Lilium michiganense (N)
Lilium philadelphicum var. andinum (N)
Lilium philadelphicum var. philadelphicum (N)
Lilium superbum (N)
Linaria dalmatica ssp. dalmatica (I)
Linaria genistifolia (I)
Linaria vulgaris (I)
Lindera benzoin var. benzoin (N)
Lindera benzoin var. pubescens (N)
Lindernia dubia var. anagallidea (N)
Lindernia dubia var. dubia (N)
Linnaea borealis ssp. americana (N)
Linum grandiflorum (I)
Linum medium var. texanum (N)
Linum perenne (I)
Linum perenne (N)
Linum striatum (N)
Linum sulcatum var. sulcatum (N)
Linum usitatissimum (I)
Linum virginianum (N)
Liparis liliifolia (N)
Liparis loeselii (N)
Lipocarpha drummondii (N)
Lipocarpha micrantha (N)
Liquidambar styraciflua (N)
Liriodendron tulipifera (N)
Lithospermum canescens (N)
Lithospermum caroliniense var. croceum (N)
Lithospermum latifolium (N)
Lithospermum officinale (I)
Lobelia cardinalis (N)
Lobelia inflata (N)
Lobelia kalmii (N)
Lobelia puberula var. simulans (N)
Lobelia siphilitica var. siphilitica (N)
Lobelia spicata var. campanulata (N)
Lobelia spicata var. leptostachys (N)
Lobelia spicata var. spicata (N)
Lobularia maritima (I)
Lorinseria areolata (N)
Lolium perenne ssp. multiflorum (I)
Lolium perenne ssp. perenne (I)
Lolium temulentum ssp. temulentum (I)
Lonicera × bella (I)
Lonicera canadensis (N)
Lonicera dioica (N)
Lonicera flava (N)
Lonicera fragrantissima (I)
Lonicera japonica (I)
Lonicera × minutiflora (I)
Lonicera morrowii (I)
Lonicera maackii (I)
Lonicera oblongifolia (N)
Lonicera reticulata (N)
Lonicera ruprechtiana (I)
Lonicera × salicifolia (I)
Lonicera sempervirens (N)
Lonicera tatarica (I)
Lonicera villosa var. tonsa (N)
Lonicera × xylosteoides (I)
Lonicera xylosteum (I)
Lotus corniculatus var. corniculatus (I)
Lotus glaber (I)
Ludwigia alternifolia (N)
Ludwigia decurrens (N)
Ludwigia leptocarpa (N)
Ludwigia palustris (N)
Ludwigia peploides (I)
Ludwigia peploides ssp. glabrescens (N)
Ludwigia polycarpa (N)
Lunaria annua (I)
Lupinus perennis ssp. perennis var. occidentalis (N)
Lupinus perennis ssp. perennis var. perennis (N)
Lupinus perennis ssp. perennis (N)
Luzula acuminata ssp. acuminata (N)
Luzula acuminata ssp. carolinae (N)
Luzula bulbosa (N)
Luzula echinata (N)
Luzula multiflora ssp. multiflora var. multiflora (N)
Luzula multiflora ssp. multiflora (N)
Lychnis coronaria (I)
Lychnis flos-cuculi (I)
Lychnis viscaria (I)
Lycium barbarum (I)
Lycium chinense (I)
Lycopodiella inundata (N)
Lycopodiella margueritiae (N)
Lycopodiella subappressa (N)
Lycopodium clavatum (N)
Lycopodium dendroideum (N)
Lycopodium digitatum (N)
Lycopodium × habereri (N)
Lycopodium hickeyi (N)
Lycopodium lagopus (N)
Lycopodium obscurum (N)
Lycopodium tristachyum (N)
Lycopus americanus (N)
Lycopus asper (N)
Lycopus europaeus (I)
Lycopus rubellus (N)
Lycopus × sherardii (N)
Lycopus uniflorus var. uniflorus (N)
Lycopus virginicus (N)
Lycoris squamigera (I)
Lygodium palmatum (N)
Lyonia ligustrina var. ligustrina (N)
Lysimachia ciliata (N)
Lysimachia lanceolata (N)
Lysimachia nummularia (I)
Lysimachia × producta (N)
Lysimachia punctata (I)
Lysimachia quadriflora (N)
Lysimachia quadrifolia (N)
Lysimachia terrestris (N)
Lysimachia thyrsiflora (N)
Lysimachia vulgaris (I)
Lythrum alatum var. alatum (N)
Lythrum hyssopifolia (I)
Lythrum portula (I)
Lythrum salicaria (I)

M 
Macleaya cordata (I)
Maclura pomifera (N)
Magnolia acuminata (N)
Magnolia fraseri (N)
Magnolia macrophylla (N)
Magnolia × soulangeana (I)
Magnolia stellata (I)
Magnolia tripetala (N)
Mahonia aquifolium (N)
Maianthemum canadense (N)
Maianthemum racemosum ssp. racemosum (N)
Maianthemum stellatum (N)
Maianthemum trifolium (N)
Malaxis unifolia (N)
Malus angustifolia var. angustifolia (N)
Malus baccata (I)
Malus coronaria (N)
Malus floribunda (I)
Malus ioensis var. ioensis (N)
Malus × platycarpa (N)
Malus pumila (I)
Malus toringo (I)
Malus zumi (I)
Malva alcea (I)
Malva moschata (I)
Malva neglecta (I)
Malva pusilla (I)
Malva sylvestris (I)
Malva verticillata (I)
Manfreda virginica (N)
Marrubium vulgare (I)
Marsilea quadrifolia (I)
Marsilea quadrifolia (N)
Matelea obliqua (N)
Matricaria discoidea (I)
Matricaria recutita (I)
Matteuccia struthiopteris (N)
Mazus pumilus (I)
Medeola virginiana (N)
Medicago lupulina (I)
Medicago polymorpha (I)
Medicago sativa ssp. falcata (I)
Medicago sativa ssp. sativa (I)
Meehania cordata (N)
Melampyrum lineare var. latifolium (N)
Melampyrum lineare var. lineare (N)
Melica nitens (N)
Melilotus altissimus (I)
Melilotus officinalis (I)
Melissa officinalis (I)
Menispermum canadense (N)
Mentha aquatica (I)
Mentha arvensis (N)
Mentha × gracilis (I)
Mentha × piperita (N)
Mentha × rotundifolia (I)
Mentha spicata (I)
Mentha suaveolens (I)
Mentha × villosa (I)
Menyanthes trifoliata (N)
Mercurialis annua (I)
Mertensia virginica (N)
Microstegium vimineum (I)
Microthlaspi perfoliatum (I)
Mikania scandens (N)
Milium effusum var. cisatlanticum (N)
Mimulus alatus (N)
Mimulus ringens var. ringens (N)
Minuartia michauxii var. michauxii (N)
Minuartia patula (N)
Mirabilis albida (N)
Mirabilis hirsuta (N)
Mirabilis jalapa (I)
Mirabilis nyctaginea (N)
Miscanthus sinensis (I)
Misopates orontium (I)
Mitchella repens (N)
Mitella diphylla (N)
Moehringia lateriflora (N)
Moehringia trinervia (I)
Mollugo verticillata (N)
Monarda clinopodia (N)
Monarda didyma (N)
Monarda fistulosa ssp. fistulosa var. fistulosa (N)
Monarda fistulosa ssp. fistulosa var. mollis (N)
Monarda fistulosa ssp. fistulosa (N)
Monarda media (N)
Monarda punctata ssp. punctata var. villicaulis (N)
Monarda punctata ssp. punctata (N)
Moneses uniflora (N)
Monolepis nuttalliana (N)
Monotropa hypopithys (N)
Monotropa uniflora (N)
Morella pensylvanica (N)
Morus alba (I)
Morus nigra (I)
Morus rubra var. rubra (N)
Muhlenbergia asperifolia (N)
Muhlenbergia capillaris (N)
Muhlenbergia × curtisetosa (N)
Muhlenbergia cuspidata (N)
Muhlenbergia frondosa (N)
Muhlenbergia glomerata (N)
Muhlenbergia mexicana (N)
Muhlenbergia schreberi (N)
Muhlenbergia sobolifera (N)
Muhlenbergia sylvatica (N)
Muhlenbergia tenuiflora (N)
Muscari armeniacum (I)
Muscari botryoides (I)
Muscari comosum (I)
Muscari neglectum (I)
Myagrum perfoliatum (I)
Myosotis arvensis (I)
Myosotis discolor (I)
Myosotis laxa (N)
Myosotis macrosperma (N)
Myosotis scorpioides (I)
Myosotis stricta (I)
Myosotis sylvatica (I)
Myosotis verna (N)
Myosoton aquaticum (I)
Myosurus minimus (N)
Myriophyllum aquaticum (I)
Myriophyllum heterophyllum (N)
Myriophyllum humile (N)
Myriophyllum pinnatum (N)
Myriophyllum sibiricum (N)
Myriophyllum spicatum (I)
Myriophyllum verticillatum (N)

N 
Najas flexilis (N)
Najas gracillima (N)
Najas guadalupensis ssp. guadalupensis (N)
Najas marina (N)
Najas minor (I)
Napaea dioica (N)
Narcissus × incomparabilis (I)
Narcissus jonquilla (I)
Narcissus × medioluteus (I)
Narcissus poeticus (I)
Narcissus pseudonarcissus (I)
Nasturtium officinale (I)
Navarretia intertexta ssp. propinqua (N)
Nelumbo lutea (N)
Nelumbo nucifera (I)
Neobeckia aquatica (N)
Neottia cordata var. cordata (N)
Nepeta cataria (I)
Neslia paniculata (I)
Nicandra physalodes (I)
Nicotiana alata (I)
Nicotiana glauca (I)
Nicotiana rustica (I)
Nicotiana tabacum (I)
Nigella damascena (I)
Nothoscordum bivalve (N)
Nuphar lutea ssp. advena (N)
Nuphar lutea ssp. variegata (N)
Nuttallanthus canadensis (N)
Nymphaea odorata ssp. odorata (N)
Nymphaea odorata ssp. tuberosa (N)
Nymphoides peltata (I)
Nyssa sylvatica (N)

O 
Obolaria virginica (N)
Oclemena acuminata (N)
Oenanthe aquatica (I)
Oenothera biennis (N)
Oenothera clelandii (N)
Oenothera fruticosa ssp. fruticosa (N)
Oenothera fruticosa ssp. glauca (N)
Oenothera laciniata (N)
Oenothera nutans (N)
Oenothera oakesiana (N)
Oenothera parviflora (N)
Oenothera perennis (N)
Oenothera pilosella ssp. pilosella (N)
Oenothera speciosa (N)
Oenothera triloba (N)
Oenothera villosa ssp. villosa (N)
Oligoneuron album (N)
Oligoneuron ohioense (N)
Oligoneuron riddellii (N)
Oligoneuron rigidum var. glabratum (N)
Oligoneuron rigidum var. rigidum (N)
Onoclea sensibilis (N)
Onopordum acanthium (I)
Onosmodium bejariense var. hispidissimum (N)
Ophioglossum engelmannii (N)
Ophioglossum pusillum (N)
Ophioglossum vulgatum (N)
Opuntia humifusa (N)
Opuntia macrorhiza var. macrorhiza (N)
Orbexilum onobrychis (N)
Orbexilum pedunculatum var. pedunculatum (N)
Origanum vulgare (I)
Ornithogalum nutans (I)
Ornithogalum umbellatum (I)
Orobanche ludoviciana ssp. ludoviciana (N)
Orobanche uniflora (N)
Orthilia secunda (N)
Oryzopsis asperifolia (N)
Osmorhiza claytonii (N)
Osmorhiza longistylis (N)
Osmunda cinnamomea var. cinnamomea (N)
Osmunda claytoniana (N)
Osmunda regalis var. spectabilis (N)
Ostrya virginiana var. virginiana (N)
Oxalis corniculata (N)
Oxalis dillenii (N)
Oxalis grandis (N)
Oxalis montana (N)
Oxalis stricta (N)
Oxalis violacea (N)
Oxydendrum arboreum (N)
Oxypolis rigidior (N)

P 
Pachysandra terminalis (I)
Packera anonyma (N)
Packera aurea (N)
Packera glabella (N)
Packera obovata (N)
Packera paupercula (N)
Packera plattensis (N)
Panax quinquefolius (N)
Panax trifolius (N)
Panicum anceps (N)
Panicum capillare (N)
Panicum dichotomiflorum var. dichotomiflorum (N)
Panicum flexile (N)
Panicum gattingeri (N)
Panicum miliaceum ssp. miliaceum (I)
Panicum philadelphicum (N)
Panicum rigidulum var. elongatum (N)
Panicum rigidulum var. pubescens (N)
Panicum rigidulum var. rigidulum (N)
Panicum verrucosum (N)
Panicum virgatum var. virgatum (N)
Papaver argemone (I)
Papaver dubium (I)
Papaver rhoeas (I)
Papaver somniferum (I)
Parietaria pensylvanica (N)
Parnassia glauca (N)
Paronychia canadensis (N)
Paronychia fastigiata var. fastigiata (N)
Parthenium hysterophorus (I)
Parthenium integrifolium var. integrifolium (N)
Parthenocissus quinquefolia (N)
Parthenocissus tricuspidata (I)
Parthenocissus vitacea (N)
Pascopyrum smithii (N)
Paspalum floridanum (N)
Paspalum fluitans (N)
Paspalum laeve (N)
Paspalum pubiflorum (N)
Paspalum setaceum (N)
Passiflora incarnata (N)
Passiflora lutea (N)
Pastinaca sativa (I)
Paulownia tomentosa (I)
Paxistima canbyi (N)
Pedicularis canadensis ssp. canadensis (N)
Pedicularis lanceolata (N)
Pellaea atropurpurea (N)
Pellaea glabella ssp. glabella (N)
Peltandra virginica (N)
Pennisetum glaucum (I)
Penstemon alluviorum (N)
Penstemon calycosus (N)
Penstemon canescens (N)
Penstemon cobaea (N)
Penstemon digitalis (N)
Penstemon grandiflorus (N)
Penstemon hirsutus (N)
Penstemon laevigatus (N)
Penstemon pallidus (N)
Penstemon tubiflorus var. tubiflorus (N)
Penthorum sedoides (N)
Perideridia americana (N)
Perilla frutescens var. frutescens (I)
Petasites hybridus (I)
Petrorhagia prolifera (I)
Petrorhagia saxifraga (I)
Petroselinum crispum (I)
Petunia × atkinsiana (I)
Petunia axillaris (I)
Phacelia bipinnatifida (N)
Phacelia dubia var. dubia (N)
Phacelia purshii (N)
Phacelia ranunculacea (N)
Phalaris arundinacea (N)
Phalaris canariensis (I)
Phalaris caroliniana (N)
Phaseolus coccineus (I)
Phaseolus polystachios var. polystachios (N)
Phaseolus vulgaris (I)
Phegopteris connectilis (N)
Phegopteris hexagonoptera (N)
Phellodendron amurense (I)
Philadelphus coronarius (I)
Philadelphus inodorus (N)
Philadelphus pubescens var. pubescens (N)
Philadelphus tomentosus (I)
Phleum pratense (I)
Phlox divaricata ssp. divaricata (N)
Phlox glaberrima ssp. triflora (N)
Phlox latifolia (N)
Phlox maculata ssp. maculata (N)
Phlox maculata ssp. pyramidalis (N)
Phlox paniculata (N)
Phlox pilosa ssp. pilosa (N)
Phlox stolonifera (N)
Phlox subulata ssp. brittonii (N)
Phlox subulata ssp. subulata (N)
Phoradendron leucarpum (N)
Photinia floribunda (N)
Photinia melanocarpa (N)
Phragmites australis (N)
Phryma leptostachya (N)
Phyla lanceolata (N)
Phyllanthus caroliniensis ssp. caroliniensis (N)
Physalis alkekengi (I)
Physalis grisea (N)
Physalis heterophylla var. heterophylla (N)
Physalis hispida (N)
Physalis longifolia var. longifolia (N)
Physalis longifolia var. subglabrata (N)
Physalis philadelphica var. immaculata (I)
Physalis pubescens var. integrifolia (N)
Physalis pubescens var. pubescens (N)
Physalis virginiana var. virginiana (N)
Physocarpus opulifolius var. intermedius (N)
Physocarpus opulifolius var. opulifolius (N)
Physostegia virginiana ssp. praemorsa (N)
Physostegia virginiana ssp. virginiana (N)
Phytolacca americana var. americana (N)
Picea abies (I)
Picris echioides (I)
Picris hieracioides (N)
Picris hieracioides ssp. hieracioides (I)
Pilea fontana (N)
Pilea pumila var. pumila (N)
Pimpinella saxifraga ssp. saxifraga (I)
Pinellia ternata (I)
Pinus banksiana (N)
Pinus echinata (N)
Pinus nigra (I)
Pinus rigida (N)
Pinus strobus (N)
Pinus sylvestris (I)
Pinus virginiana (N)
Piptatherum racemosum (N)
Piptochaetium avenaceum (N)
Pistia stratiotes (N)
Pityopsis graminifolia var. latifolia (N)
Plantago aristata (N)
Plantago cordata (N)
Plantago lanceolata (I)
Plantago major (I)
Plantago patagonica (N)
Plantago psyllium (I)
Plantago rugelii var. rugelii (N)
Plantago virginica (N)
Platanthera × andrewsii (N)
Platanthera aquilonis (N)
Platanthera blephariglottis var. blephariglottis (N)
Platanthera ciliaris (N)
Platanthera clavellata (N)
Platanthera flava var. herbiola (N)
Platanthera grandiflora (N)
Platanthera hookeri (N)
Platanthera lacera (N)
Platanthera leucophaea (N)
Platanthera orbiculata (N)
Platanthera peramoena (N)
Platanthera psycodes (N)
Platanus occidentalis (N)
Pleopeltis polypodioides ssp. michauxiana (N)
Pluchea camphorata (N)
Poa alsodes (N)
Poa annua (I)
Poa arida (N)
Poa bulbosa (I)
Poa chapmaniana (N)
Poa compressa (I)
Poa cuspidata (N)
Poa nemoralis (N)
Poa nemoralis ssp. nemoralis (I)
Poa paludigena (N)
Poa palustris (N)
Poa pratensis (I)
Poa pratensis ssp. pratensis (N)
Poa saltuensis (N)
Poa sylvestris (N)
Poa trivialis (I)
Poa wolfii (N)
Podophyllum peltatum (N)
Podostemum ceratophyllum (N)
Pogonia ophioglossoides (N)
Polanisia dodecandra ssp. dodecandra (N)
Polanisia dodecandra ssp. trachysperma (N)
Polanisia jamesii (N)
Polemonium caeruleum (I)
Polemonium reptans var. reptans (N)
Polemonium reptans var. villosum (N)
Polygala ambigua (N)
Polygala cruciata var. aquilonia (N)
Polygala curtissii (N)
Polygala incarnata (N)
Polygala paucifolia (N)
Polygala polygama (N)
Polygala sanguinea (N)
Polygala senega (N)
Polygala verticillata var. isocycla (N)
Polygala verticillata var. verticillata (N)
Polygonatum biflorum var. commutatum (N)
Polygonatum pubescens (N)
Polygonum achoreum (N)
Polygonum amphibium var. emersum (N)
Polygonum amphibium var. stipulaceum (N)
Polygonum arenastrum (I)
Polygonum arifolium (N)
Polygonum aviculare (I)
Polygonum buxiforme (N)
Polygonum careyi (N)
Polygonum cespitosum var. longisetum (I)
Polygonum ciliinode (N)
Polygonum convolvulus var. convolvulus (I)
Polygonum erectum (N)
Polygonum fowleri ssp. fowleri (N)
Polygonum hydropiper (I)
Polygonum hydropiperoides (N)
Polygonum lapathifolium (N)
Polygonum orientale (I)
Polygonum pensylvanicum (N)
Polygonum perfoliatum (I)
Polygonum persicaria (I)
Polygonum punctatum var. confertiflorum (N)
Polygonum punctatum var. punctatum (N)
Polygonum ramosissimum var. ramosissimum (N)
Polygonum robustius (N)
Polygonum sachalinense (I)
Polygonum sagittatum (N)
Polygonum scandens var. cristatum (N)
Polygonum scandens var. dumetorum (N)
Polygonum scandens var. scandens (N)
Polygonum scandens var. dumetorum (I)
Polygonum setaceum (N)
Polygonum tenue (N)
Polygonum virginianum (N)
Polymnia canadensis (N)
Polypodium appalachianum (N)
Polypodium virginianum (N)
Polystichum acrostichoides var. acrostichoides (N)
Pontederia cordata (N)
Populus alba (I)
Populus balsamifera ssp. balsamifera (N)
Populus × canadensis (N)
Populus × canescens (I)
Populus deltoides ssp. deltoides (N)
Populus deltoides ssp. monilifera (N)
Populus grandidentata (N)
Populus heterophylla (N)
Populus × jackii (N)
Populus nigra (I)
Populus × smithii (N)
Populus tremuloides (N)
Portulaca grandiflora (I)
Portulaca oleracea (I)
Portulaca oleracea (N)
Potamogeton amplifolius (N)
Potamogeton compressus (N)
Potamogeton crispus (I)
Potamogeton diversifolius (N)
Potamogeton epihydrus (N)
Potamogeton foliosus ssp. foliosus (N)
Potamogeton friesii (N)
Potamogeton gramineus (N)
Potamogeton × hagstroemii (N)
Potamogeton hillii (N)
Potamogeton illinoensis (N)
Potamogeton natans (N)
Potamogeton nodosus (N)
Potamogeton perfoliatus (N)
Potamogeton praelongus (N)
Potamogeton pulcher (N)
Potamogeton pusillus ssp. pusillus (N)
Potamogeton pusillus ssp. tenuissimus (N)
Potamogeton × rectifolius (N)
Potamogeton richardsonii (N)
Potamogeton robbinsii (N)
Potamogeton spirillus (N)
Potamogeton strictifolius (N)
Potamogeton tennesseensis (N)
Potamogeton vaseyi (N)
Potentilla argentea var. argentea (I)
Potentilla arguta ssp. arguta (N)
Potentilla canadensis var. canadensis (N)
Potentilla canadensis var. villosissima (N)
Potentilla inclinata (I)
Potentilla intermedia (I)
Potentilla norvegica ssp. monspeliensis (N)
Potentilla paradoxa (N)
Potentilla pensylvanica var. pensylvanica (N)
Potentilla recta (I)
Potentilla reptans (I)
Potentilla simplex (N)
Prenanthes alba (N)
Prenanthes altissima (N)
Prenanthes aspera (N)
Prenanthes crepidinea (N)
Prenanthes racemosa var. racemosa (N)
Prenanthes serpentaria (N)
Prenanthes trifoliolata (N)
Proboscidea louisianica ssp. louisianica (N)
Prosartes lanuginosa (N)
Prosartes maculata (N)
Proserpinaca palustris var. amblyogona (N)
Proserpinaca palustris var. crebra (N)
Prunella laciniata (I)
Prunella vulgaris ssp. lanceolata (N)
Prunus americana (N)
Prunus avium (I)
Prunus cerasifera (I)
Prunus cerasus (I)
Prunus domestica var. domestica (I)
Prunus hortulana (N)
Prunus mahaleb (I)
Prunus mexicana (N)
Prunus munsoniana (N)
Prunus nigra (N)
Prunus pensylvanica var. pensylvanica (N)
Prunus persica var. persica (I)
Prunus pumila var. pumila (N)
Prunus serotina var. serotina (N)
Prunus subhirtella (I)
Prunus susquehanae (N) (here considered a synonym of P. pumila)
Prunus tomentosa (I)
Prunus virginiana var. virginiana (N)
Psammophiliella muralis (syn. Gypsophila muralis) (I)
Pseudognaphalium macounii (N)
Pseudognaphalium obtusifolium ssp. obtusifolium (N)
Pseudolysimachion longifolium (I)
Ptelea trifoliata ssp. trifoliata var. trifoliata (N)
Ptelea trifoliata ssp. trifoliata (N)
Pteridium aquilinum var. latiusculum (N)
Pteridium aquilinum var. pseudocaudatum (N)
Puccinellia distans (N)
Puccinellia distans ssp. distans (I)
Pueraria montana var. lobata (I)
Pycnanthemum incanum var. incanum (N)
Pycnanthemum incanum var. puberulum (N)
Pycnanthemum muticum (N)
Pycnanthemum pycnanthemoides var. pycnanthemoides (N)
Pycnanthemum tenuifolium (N)
Pycnanthemum verticillatum var. pilosum (N)
Pycnanthemum verticillatum var. verticillatum (N)
Pycnanthemum virginianum (N)
Pyracantha coccinea (I)
Pyracantha coccinea (N)
Pyrola americana (N)
Pyrola asarifolia ssp. asarifolia (N)
Pyrola chlorantha (N)
Pyrola elliptica (N)
Pyrus calleryana (I)
Pyrus communis (I)

Q 
Quercus alba (N)
Quercus × bebbiana (N)
Quercus bicolor (N)
Quercus × bushii (N)
Quercus coccinea var. coccinea (N)
Quercus coccinea var. tuberculata (N)
Quercus × deamii (N)
Quercus ellipsoidalis (N)
Quercus × exacta (N)
Quercus falcata (N)
Quercus × fontana (N)
Quercus × hawkinsiae (N)
Quercus imbricaria (N)
Quercus × jackiana (N)
Quercus × leana (N)
Quercus macrocarpa var. macrocarpa (N)
Quercus marilandica var. marilandica (N)
Quercus muehlenbergii (N)
Quercus × mutabilis (N)
Quercus × palaeolithicola (N)
Quercus palustris (N)
Quercus prinus (N)
Quercus robur (I)
Quercus rubra var. ambigua (N)
Quercus rubra var. rubra (N)
Quercus × runcinata (N)
Quercus × saulii (N)
Quercus × schuettei (N)
Quercus shumardii var. schneckii (N)
Quercus shumardii var. shumardii (N)
Quercus stellata (N)
Quercus × tridentata (N)
Quercus velutina (N)

R 
Ranunculus abortivus (N)
Ranunculus acris var. acris (N)
Ranunculus acris var. acris (I)
Ranunculus allegheniensis (N)
Ranunculus ambigens (N)
Ranunculus arvensis (I)
Ranunculus bulbosus (I)
Ranunculus fascicularis (N)
Ranunculus ficaria var. bulbifera (I)
Ranunculus flabellaris (N)
Ranunculus hispidus var. caricetorum (N)
Ranunculus hispidus var. hispidus (N)
Ranunculus hispidus var. nitidus (N)
Ranunculus longirostris (N)
Ranunculus micranthus (N)
Ranunculus parviflorus (I)
Ranunculus pensylvanicus (N)
Ranunculus pusillus var. pusillus (N)
Ranunculus recurvatus var. recurvatus (N)
Ranunculus repens (I)
Ranunculus sceleratus var. sceleratus (N)
Raphanus raphanistrum (I)
Raphanus sativus (I)
Ratibida columnifera (N)
Ratibida pinnata (N)
Reseda alba (I)
Reseda lutea (I)
Reseda luteola (I)
Reynoutria japonica (syn. Polygonum cuspidatum) (I)
Rhamnus alnifolia (N)
Rhamnus cathartica (I)
Rhamnus davurica ssp. davurica (I)
Rhamnus lanceolata ssp. glabrata (N)
Rhamnus lanceolata ssp. lanceolata (N)
Rhamnus utilis (I)
Rheum rhabarbarum (I)
Rhexia virginica (N)
Rhododendron calendulaceum (N)
Rhododendron maximum (N)
Rhododendron periclymenoides (N)
Rhododendron prinophyllum (N)
Rhodotypos scandens (I)
Rhus aromatica var. arenaria (N)
Rhus aromatica var. aromatica (N)
Rhus copallinum var. latifolia (N)
Rhus glabra (N)
Rhus pulvinata (N)
Rhus typhina (N)
Rhynchospora alba (N)
Rhynchospora capillacea (N)
Rhynchospora capitellata (N)
Rhynchospora recognita (N)
Ribes americanum (N)
Ribes aureum var. villosum (N)
Ribes cynosbati (N)
Ribes glandulosum (N)
Ribes hirtellum (N)
Ribes missouriense (N)
Ribes nigrum (I)
Ribes oxyacanthoides ssp. oxyacanthoides (N)
Ribes rotundifolium (N)
Ribes rubrum (I)
Ribes triste (N)
Ribes uva-crispa var. sativum (I)
Ricinus communis (I)
Robinia × ambigua (N)
Robinia hispida var. fertilis (N)
Robinia hispida var. hispida (N)
Robinia pseudoacacia (N)
Robinia viscosa var. viscosa (N)
Rorippa palustris ssp. fernaldiana (N)
Rorippa palustris ssp. hispida (N)
Rorippa sessiliflora (N)
Rorippa sylvestris (I)
Rosa arkansana var. suffulta (N)
Rosa blanda var. blanda (N)
Rosa canina (I)
Rosa carolina var. carolina (N)
Rosa centifolia (I)
Rosa cinnamomea (I)
Rosa eglanteria (I)
Rosa gallica (I)
Rosa majalis (I)
Rosa micrantha (I)
Rosa multiflora (I)
Rosa nitida (N)
Rosa × palustriformis (N)
Rosa palustris (N)
Rosa pimpinellifolia (I)
Rosa × rudiuscula (N)
Rosa rugosa (I)
Rosa setigera var. setigera (N)
Rosa setigera var. tomentosa (N)
Rosa wichuraiana (I)
Rotala ramosior (N)
Rubus aboriginum (N)
Rubus allegheniensis var. allegheniensis (N)
Rubus allegheniensis var. gravesii (N)
Rubus alumnus (N)
Rubus argutus (N)
Rubus armeniacus (I)
Rubus baileyanus (N)
Rubus bellobatus (N)
Rubus canadensis (N)
Rubus deamii (N)
Rubus depavitus (N)
Rubus fecundus (N)
Rubus flagellaris (N)
Rubus frondosus (N)
Rubus hispidus (N)
Rubus idaeus ssp. strigosus (N)
Rubus idaeus ssp. idaeus (I)
Rubus invisus (N)
Rubus laciniatus (I)
Rubus laudatus (N)
Rubus meracus (N)
Rubus michiganensis (N)
Rubus multifer (N)
Rubus occidentalis (N)
Rubus odoratus var. odoratus (N)
Rubus pensilvanicus (N)
Rubus pergratus (N)
Rubus philadelphicus (N)
Rubus phoenicolasius (I)
Rubus plicatifolius (N)
Rubus prestonensis (N)
Rubus pubescens var. pubescens (N)
Rubus recurvans (N)
Rubus recurvicaulis (N)
Rubus roribaccus (N)
Rubus rosa (N)
Rubus setosus (N)
Rubus suus (N)
Rubus trivialis (N)
Rubus uvidus (N)
Rubus vagus (N)
Rudbeckia fulgida var. deamii (N)
Rudbeckia fulgida var. fulgida (N)
Rudbeckia fulgida var. speciosa (N)
Rudbeckia fulgida var. umbrosa (N)
Rudbeckia grandiflora var. grandiflora (N)
Rudbeckia hirta var. hirta (N)
Rudbeckia hirta var. pulcherrima (N)
Rudbeckia laciniata var. laciniata (N)
Rudbeckia triloba var. triloba (N)
Ruellia caroliniensis ssp. caroliniensis var. caroliniensis (N)
Ruellia caroliniensis ssp. caroliniensis (N)
Ruellia humilis (N)
Ruellia strepens (N)
Rumex acetosa (N)
Rumex acetosa ssp. acetosa (I)
Rumex acetosella (I)
Rumex × acutus (I)
Rumex × acutus (N)
Rumex altissimus (N)
Rumex conglomeratus (I)
Rumex crispus ssp. crispus (I)
Rumex maritimus (N)
Rumex obtusifolius (I)
Rumex orbiculatus var. borealis (N)
Rumex orbiculatus var. orbiculatus (N)
Rumex patientia (I)
Rumex salicifolius var. mexicanus (N)
Rumex verticillatus (N)
Ruppia cirrhosa (N)

S 
Sabatia angularis (N)
Saccharum alopecuroides (N)
Saccharum ravennae (I)
Sagina decumbens ssp. decumbens (N)
Sagina japonica (I)
Sagina procumbens (I)
Sagina procumbens (N)
Sagittaria australis (N)
Sagittaria brevirostra (N)
Sagittaria calycina var. calycina (N)
Sagittaria cuneata (N)
Sagittaria graminea var. graminea (N)
Sagittaria latifolia (N)
Sagittaria platyphylla (N)
Sagittaria rigida (N)
Salicornia depressa (N)
Salix alba (I)
Salix amygdaloides (N)
Salix bebbiana (N)
Salix candida (N)
Salix caprea (I)
Salix caroliniana (N)
Salix cinerea (I)
Salix discolor (N)
Salix × ehrhartiana (I)
Salix × ehrhartiana (N)
Salix eriocephala (N)
Salix fragilis (I)
Salix × glatfelteri (N)
Salix humilis var. humilis (N)
Salix humilis var. tristis (N)
Salix interior (N)
Salix lucida ssp. lucida (N)
Salix matsudana (I)
Salix myricoides var. albovestita (N)
Salix myricoides var. myricoides (N)
Salix nigra (N)
Salix pedicellaris (N)
Salix × pendulina (I)
Salix pentandra (I)
Salix petiolaris (N)
Salix purpurea (I)
Salix × rubens (I)
Salix sericea (N)
Salix serissima (N)
Salix viminalis (I)
Salsola collina (I)
Salsola tragus (I)
Salvia azurea var. grandiflora (N)
Salvia coccinea (N)
Salvia farinacea (N)
Salvia lyrata (N)
Salvia officinalis (I)
Salvia pratensis (I)
Salvia reflexa (N)
Salvia splendens (I)
Salvia × superba (I)
Salvia × sylvestris (I)
Sambucus nigra (I)
Sambucus nigra ssp. canadensis (N)
Sambucus racemosa var. racemosa (N)
Samolus valerandi (I)
Samolus valerandi ssp. parviflorus (N)
Sanguinaria canadensis (N)
Sanguisorba canadensis (N)
Sanguisorba minor ssp. balearica (I)
Sanicula canadensis var. canadensis (N)
Sanicula canadensis var. grandis (N)
Sanicula marilandica (N)
Sanicula odorata (N)
Sanicula smallii (N)
Sanicula trifoliata (N)
Saponaria officinalis (I)
Sarracenia purpurea ssp. purpurea (N)
Sassafras albidum (N)
Satureja hortensis (I)
Saururus cernuus (N)
Saxifraga pensylvanica (N)
Saxifraga virginiensis var. virginiensis (N)
Scabiosa columbaria (I)
Scandix pecten-veneris (I)
Schedonorus phoenix (I)
Schedonorus pratensis (I)
Scheuchzeria palustris ssp. americana (N)
Schizachne purpurascens (N)
Schizachyrium littorale (N)
Schizachyrium scoparium var. scoparium (N)
Schoenoplectus acutus var. acutus (N)
Schoenoplectus fluviatilis (N)
Schoenoplectus pungens var. pungens (N)
Schoenoplectus purshianus (N)
Schoenoplectus saximontanus (N)
Schoenoplectus smithii (N)
Schoenoplectus subterminalis (N)
Schoenoplectus tabernaemontani (N)
Schoenoplectus torreyi (N)
Scilla siberica (I)
Scirpus atrovirens (N)
Scirpus cyperinus (N)
Scirpus expansus (N)
Scirpus georgianus (N)
Scirpus hattorianus (N)
Scirpus pedicellatus (N)
Scirpus pendulus (N)
Scirpus polyphyllus (N)
Scleranthus annuus (I)
Scleria oligantha (N)
Scleria pauciflora var. caroliniana (N)
Scleria pauciflora var. pauciflora (N)
Scleria triglomerata (N)
Scleria verticillata (N)
Sclerochloa dura (I)
Sclerochloa dura (N)
Scrophularia lanceolata (N)
Scrophularia marilandica (N)
Scutellaria elliptica var. elliptica (N)
Scutellaria elliptica var. hirsuta (N)
Scutellaria galericulata (N)
Scutellaria incana var. incana (N)
Scutellaria integrifolia (N)
Scutellaria lateriflora var. lateriflora (N)
Scutellaria nervosa (N)
Scutellaria ovata ssp. ovata (N)
Scutellaria parvula var. missouriensis (N)
Scutellaria parvula var. parvula (N)
Scutellaria saxatilis (N)
Scutellaria serrata (N)
Secale cereale (I)
Securigera varia (I)
Sedum acre (I)
Sedum album (I)
Sedum dendroideum (I)
Sedum pulchellum (N)
Sedum reflexum (I)
Sedum sarmentosum (I)
Sedum sexangulare (I)
Sedum ternatum (N)
Selaginella apoda (N)
Selaginella eclipes (N)
Selaginella rupestris (N)
Senecio sylvaticus (I)
Senecio vulgaris (I)
Senna hebecarpa (N)
Senna marilandica (N)
Sericocarpus asteroides (N)
Sericocarpus linifolius (N)
Sesamum orientale (I)
Setaria faberi (I)
Setaria italica (I)
Setaria parviflora (N)
Setaria pumila ssp. pumila (I)
Setaria verticillata (I)
Setaria viridis var. viridis (I)
Shepherdia canadensis (N)
Sherardia arvensis (I)
Sibara virginica (N)
Sicyos angulatus (N)
Sida hermaphrodita (N)
Sida spinosa (N)
Silene antirrhina (N)
Silene armeria (I)
Silene caroliniana ssp. pensylvanica (N)
Silene caroliniana ssp. wherryi (N)
Silene conica (I)
Silene csereii (I)
Silene dichotoma (I)
Silene dioica (I)
Silene latifolia ssp. alba (I)
Silene nivea (N)
Silene noctiflora (I)
Silene nutans (I)
Silene regia (N)
Silene rotundifolia (N)
Silene stellata (N)
Silene virginica var. virginica (N)
Silene vulgaris (I)
Silphium laciniatum var. laciniatum (N)
Silphium perfoliatum var. perfoliatum (N)
Silphium terebinthinaceum var. luciae-brauniae (N)
Silphium terebinthinaceum var. terebinthinaceum (N)
Silphium trifoliatum var. latifolium (N)
Silphium trifoliatum var. trifoliatum (N)
Silybum marianum (I)
Sinapis alba (I)
Sinapis arvensis ssp. arvensis (I)
Sisymbrium altissimum (I)
Sisymbrium irio (I)
Sisymbrium loeselii (I)
Sisymbrium officinale (I)
Sisyrinchium albidum (N)
Sisyrinchium angustifolium (N)
Sisyrinchium atlanticum (N)
Sisyrinchium montanum var. crebrum (N)
Sisyrinchium mucronatum (N)
Sium suave (N)
Smallanthus uvedalia (N)
Smilax ecirrhata (N)
Smilax glauca (N)
Smilax herbacea (N)
Smilax illinoensis (N)
Smilax lasioneura (N)
Smilax pulverulenta (N)
Smilax rotundifolia (N)
Smilax tamnoides (N)
Solanum carolinense var. carolinense (N)
Solanum dulcamara var. dulcamara (I)
Solanum lycopersicum var. lycopersicum (I)
Solanum physalifolium (I)
Solanum ptychanthum (N)
Solanum rostratum (N)
Solanum triflorum (N)
Solanum tuberosum (I)
Solidago altissima (N)
Solidago arguta var. arguta (N)
Solidago bicolor (N)
Solidago caesia (N)
Solidago canadensis var. canadensis (N)
Solidago canadensis var. gilvocanescens (N)
Solidago canadensis var. hargeri (N)
Solidago erecta (N)
Solidago flexicaulis (N)
Solidago gigantea (N)
Solidago hispida var. hispida (N)
Solidago juncea (N)
Solidago nemoralis var. nemoralis (N)
Solidago odora var. odora (N)
Solidago patula var. patula (N)
Solidago puberula var. puberula (N)
Solidago rugosa ssp. aspera (N)
Solidago rugosa ssp. rugosa var. rugosa (N)
Solidago rugosa ssp. rugosa var. villosa (N)
Solidago rugosa ssp. rugosa (N)
Solidago rupestris (N)
Solidago sempervirens var. sempervirens (N)
Solidago speciosa var. rigidiuscula (N)
Solidago speciosa var. speciosa (N)
Solidago sphacelata (N)
Solidago squarrosa (N)
Solidago uliginosa var. linoides (N)
Solidago uliginosa var. uliginosa (N)
Solidago ulmifolia var. ulmifolia (N)
Sonchus arvensis ssp. arvensis (I)
Sonchus arvensis ssp. uliginosus (I)
Sonchus asper (I)
Sonchus oleraceus (I)
Sorbaria sorbifolia (I)
Sorbus aucuparia (I)
Sorbus decora (N)
Sorghastrum nutans (N)
Sorghum bicolor ssp. bicolor (I)
Sorghum halepense (I)
Sparganium americanum (N)
Sparganium androcladum (N)
Sparganium emersum (I)
Sparganium emersum (N)
Sparganium eurycarpum (N)
Spartina pectinata (N)
Spergula arvensis (I)
Spergularia maritima (I)
Spergularia rubra (I)
Spergularia salina (N)
Spermacoce glabra (N)
Sphenopholis intermedia (N)
Sphenopholis nitida (N)
Sphenopholis obtusata (N)
Sphenopholis × pallens (N)
Sphenopholis pensylvanica (N)
Spinacia oleracea (I)
Spiraea alba var. alba (N)
Spiraea alba var. latifolia (N)
Spiraea japonica var. fortunei (I)
Spiraea prunifolia (I)
Spiraea tomentosa (N)
Spiraea × vanhouttei (I)
Spiraea virginiana (N)
Spiranthes cernua (N)
Spiranthes lacera var. gracilis (N)
Spiranthes lacera var. lacera (N)
Spiranthes lucida (N)
Spiranthes magnicamporum (N)
Spiranthes ochroleuca (N)
Spiranthes ovalis var. erostellata (N)
Spiranthes romanzoffiana (N)
Spiranthes tuberosa (N)
Spiranthes vernalis (N)
Spirodela polyrrhiza (N)
Sporobolus compositus var. compositus (N)
Sporobolus cryptandrus (N)
Sporobolus heterolepis (N)
Sporobolus neglectus (N)
Sporobolus vaginiflorus var. ozarkanus (N)
Sporobolus vaginiflorus var. vaginiflorus (N)
Stachys aspera (N)
Stachys cordata (N)
Stachys germanica (I)
Stachys palustris (N)
Stachys pilosa var. arenicola (N)
Stachys sylvatica (I)
Stachys tenuifolia (N)
Staphylea trifolia (N)
Stellaria alsine (N)
Stellaria corei (N)
Stellaria graminea (I)
Stellaria holostea (I)
Stellaria longifolia var. longifolia (N)
Stellaria media ssp. media (I)
Stellaria media ssp. pallida (I)
Stellaria pubera (N)
Stenanthium gramineum var. gramineum (N)
Stenanthium gramineum var. robustum (N)
Stenaria nigricans var. nigricans (N)
Stenosiphon linifolius (N)
Streptopus lanceolatus var. lanceolatus (N)
Streptopus lanceolatus var. roseus (N)
Strophostyles helvola (N)
Strophostyles leiosperma (N)
Strophostyles umbellata (N)
Stuckenia filiformis ssp. alpina (N)
Stuckenia pectinata (N)
Stuckenia vaginata (N)
Stylophorum diphyllum (N)
Stylosanthes biflora (N)
Styphnolobium japonicum (I)
Styrax americanus (N)
Styrax grandifolius (N)
Suaeda calceoliformis (N)
Sullivantia sullivantii (N)
Symphoricarpos albus var. albus (N)
Symphoricarpos albus var. laevigatus (N)
Symphoricarpos occidentalis (N)
Symphoricarpos orbiculatus (N)
Symphyotrichum boreale (N)
Symphyotrichum ciliatum (N)
Symphyotrichum cordifolium (N)
Symphyotrichum drummondii var. drummondii (N)
Symphyotrichum dumosum var. strictior (N)
Symphyotrichum ericoides var. ericoides (N)
Symphyotrichum laeve var. laeve (N)
Symphyotrichum lanceolatum ssp. lanceolatum var. hirsuticaule (N)
Symphyotrichum lanceolatum ssp. lanceolatum var. interior (N)
Symphyotrichum lanceolatum ssp. lanceolatum var. lanceolatum (N)
Symphyotrichum lanceolatum ssp. lanceolatum var. latifolium (N)
Symphyotrichum lanceolatum ssp. lanceolatum (N)
Symphyotrichum lateriflorum var. lateriflorum (N)
Symphyotrichum lowrieanum (N)
Symphyotrichum novae-angliae (N)
Symphyotrichum oblongifolium (N)
Symphyotrichum ontarionis (N)
Symphyotrichum oolentangiense var. oolentangiense (N)
Symphyotrichum patens var. patens (N)
Symphyotrichum phlogifolium (N)
Symphyotrichum pilosum var. pilosum (N)
Symphyotrichum pilosum var. pringlei (N)
Symphyotrichum praealtum var. praealtum (N)
Symphyotrichum prenanthoides (N)
Symphyotrichum puniceum var. puniceum (N)
Symphyotrichum racemosum (N)
Symphyotrichum sericeum (N)
Symphyotrichum shortii (N)
Symphyotrichum subulatum (N)
Symphyotrichum undulatum (N)
Symphyotrichum urophyllum (N)
Symphytum asperum (I)
Symphytum officinale (I)
Symplocarpus foetidus (N)
Synandra hispidula (N)
Syringa vulgaris (I)

T 
Taenidia integerrima (N)
Tagetes erecta (I)
Tagetes patula (I)
Tamarix chinensis (I)
Tanacetum balsamita (I)
Tanacetum coccineum (I)
Tanacetum parthenium (I)
Tanacetum vulgare (I)
Taraxacum laevigatum (I)
Taraxacum officinale (N)
Taraxacum officinale ssp. officinale (I)
Taxodium distichum (N)
Taxus canadensis (N)
Taxus cuspidata (I)
Tephrosia virginiana (N)
Tetradium daniellii (I)
Tetragonia tetragonioides (I)
Tetraneuris herbacea (N)
Teucrium canadense var. canadense (N)
Teucrium canadense var. occidentale (N)
Thalictrum dasycarpum (N)
Thalictrum dioicum (N)
Thalictrum pubescens (N)
Thalictrum revolutum (N)
Thalictrum thalictroides (N)
Thaspium barbinode (N)
Thaspium trifoliatum var. aureum (N)
Thaspium trifoliatum var. trifoliatum (N)
Thelypteris noveboracensis (N)
Thelypteris palustris var. pubescens (N)
Thlaspi alliaceum (I)
Thlaspi arvense (I)
Thuja occidentalis (N)
Thymelaea passerina (I)
Thymelaea passerina (N)
Thymus praecox ssp. arcticus (I)
Tiarella cordifolia var. cordifolia (N)
Tilia americana var. americana (N)
Tilia americana var. heterophylla (N)
Tilia × europaea (I)
Tipularia discolor (N)
Torilis arvensis ssp. arvensis (N)
Torilis arvensis ssp. arvensis (I)
Torilis japonica (I)
Torreyochloa pallida var. pallida (N)
Toxicodendron radicans ssp. negundo (N)
Toxicodendron rydbergii (N)
Toxicodendron vernix (N)
Tradescantia ohiensis (N)
Tradescantia subaspera var. subaspera (N)
Tradescantia virginiana (N)
Tragopogon dubius (I)
Tragopogon lamottei (I)
Tragopogon porrifolius (I)
Triadenum fraseri (N)
Triadenum tubulosum (N)
Triadenum virginicum (N)
Triadenum walteri (N)
Triantha glutinosa (N)
Tribulus terrestris (I)
Trichomanes boschianum (N)
Trichomanes intricatum (N)
Trichophorum planifolium (N)
Trichostema brachiatum (N)
Trichostema dichotomum (N)
Trichostema setaceum (N)
Tridens flavus var. flavus (N)
Trientalis borealis ssp. borealis (N)
Trifolium ambiguum (I)
Trifolium arvense (I)
Trifolium aureum (I)
Trifolium campestre (I)
Trifolium dubium (I)
Trifolium hybridum (I)
Trifolium incarnatum (I)
Trifolium pratense (I)
Trifolium reflexum (N)
Trifolium repens (I)
Trifolium resupinatum (I)
Trifolium stoloniferum (N)
Triglochin maritima (N)
Triglochin palustris (N)
Trillium cernuum (N)
Trillium erectum (N)
Trillium flexipes (N)
Trillium grandiflorum (N)
Trillium nivale (N)
Trillium recurvatum (N)
Trillium sessile (N)
Trillium undulatum (N)
Triodanis perfoliata (N)
Triosteum angustifolium (N)
Triosteum aurantiacum var. aurantiacum (N)
Triosteum aurantiacum var. glaucescens (N)
Triosteum aurantiacum var. illinoense (N)
Triosteum perfoliatum (N)
Triphora trianthophora (N)
Triplasis purpurea (N)
Tripleurospermum maritimum (N)
Tripleurospermum maritimum ssp. maritimum (I)
Tripsacum dactyloides (N)
Triticum aestivum (I)
Trollius laxus ssp. laxus (N)
Tsuga canadensis (N)
Tulipa gesneriana (I)
Tussilago farfara (I)
Typha angustifolia (I)
Typha angustifolia (N)
Typha × glauca (N)
Typha latifolia (N)

U 
Ulmus americana (N)
Ulmus procera (I)
Ulmus pumila (I)
Ulmus rubra (N)
Ulmus thomasii (N)
Urtica chamaedryoides (N)
Urtica dioica ssp. gracilis (N)
Urtica dioica ssp. dioica (I)
Utricularia cornuta (N)
Utricularia geminiscapa (N)
Utricularia gibba (N)
Utricularia intermedia (N)
Utricularia macrorhiza (N)
Utricularia minor (N)
Uvularia grandiflora (N)
Uvularia perfoliata (N)
Uvularia sessilifolia (N)

V 
Vaccaria hispanica (I)
Vaccinium angustifolium (N)
Vaccinium corymbosum (N)
Vaccinium fuscatum (N)
Vaccinium macrocarpon (N)
Vaccinium myrtilloides (N)
Vaccinium oxycoccos (N)
Vaccinium pallidum (N)
Vaccinium simulatum (N)
Vaccinium stamineum (N)
Valeriana edulis var. ciliata (N)
Valeriana officinalis (I)
Valeriana pauciflora (N)
Valeriana uliginosa (N)
Valerianella chenopodiifolia (N)
Valerianella locusta (I)
Valerianella radiata (N)
Valerianella umbilicata (N)
Vallisneria americana (N)
Veratrum virginicum (N)
Veratrum viride (N)
Veratrum woodii (N)
Verbascum blattaria (I)
Verbascum phlomoides (I)
Verbascum phoeniceum (I)
Verbascum thapsus (I)
Verbascum virgatum (I)
Verbena bracteata (N)
Verbena × engelmannii (N)
Verbena hastata var. hastata (N)
Verbena × moechina (N)
Verbena simplex (N)
Verbena stricta (N)
Verbena urticifolia var. leiocarpa (N)
Verbena urticifolia var. urticifolia (N)
Verbesina alternifolia (N)
Verbesina helianthoides (N)
Verbesina occidentalis (N)
Verbesina virginica var. virginica (N)
Vernonia arkansana (N)
Vernonia fasciculata ssp. fasciculata (N)
Vernonia gigantea ssp. gigantea (N)
Vernonia × illinoensis (N)
Vernonia missurica (N)
Vernonia noveboracensis (N)
Veronica agrestis (I)
Veronica americana (N)
Veronica anagallis-aquatica (N)
Veronica arvensis (I)
Veronica austriaca ssp. teucrium (I)
Veronica beccabunga (I)
Veronica chamaedrys (I)
Veronica filiformis (I)
Veronica hederifolia (I)
Veronica officinalis var. officinalis (I)
Veronica peregrina ssp. peregrina (N)
Veronica peregrina ssp. xalapensis (N)
Veronica persica (I)
Veronica polita (I)
Veronica scutellata (N)
Veronica serpyllifolia (N)
Veronica serpyllifolia ssp. serpyllifolia (I)
Veronica verna (I)
Veronicastrum virginicum (N)
Viburnum acerifolium (N)
Viburnum buddleifolium (I)
Viburnum dentatum var. dentatum (N)
Viburnum dentatum var. venosum (N)
Viburnum lantana (I)
Viburnum lantanoides (N)
Viburnum lentago (N)
Viburnum molle (N)
Viburnum nudum var. cassinoides (N)
Viburnum opulus var. americanum (N)
Viburnum opulus var. opulus (I)
Viburnum plicatum (I)
Viburnum prunifolium (N)
Viburnum rafinesqueanum (N)
Viburnum recognitum (N)
Viburnum × rhytidophylloides (I)
Viburnum rufidulum (N)
Vicia americana ssp. americana (N)
Vicia caroliniana (N)
Vicia cracca ssp. cracca (I)
Vicia hirsuta (I)
Vicia sativa ssp. nigra (I)
Vicia sativa ssp. sativa (I)
Vicia tetrasperma (I)
Vicia villosa ssp. varia (I)
Vicia villosa ssp. villosa (I)
Vigna unguiculata (I)
Vinca major (I)
Vinca minor (I)
Viola affinis (N)
Viola arvensis (I)
Viola × bernardii (N)
Viola bicolor (N)
Viola × bissellii (N)
Viola blanda var. blanda (N)
Viola blanda var. palustriformis (N)
Viola × brauniae (N)
Viola canadensis var. canadensis (N)
Viola × conjugens (N)
Viola × consobrina (N)
Viola × cooperrideri (N)
Viola × cordifolia (N)
Viola cucullata (N)
Viola × eclipes (N)
Viola × filicetorum (N)
Viola hastata (N)
Viola hirsutula (N)
Viola labradorica (N)
Viola lanceolata ssp. lanceolata (N)
Viola macloskeyi ssp. pallens (N)
Viola × malteana (N)
Viola missouriensis (N)
Viola nephrophylla (N)
Viola odorata (I)
Viola × palmata (N)
Viola pedata (N)
Viola pedatifida (N)
Viola × populifolia (N)
Viola × primulifolia (N)
Viola pubescens var. pubescens (N)
Viola pubescens var. scabriuscula (N)
Viola × ravida (N)
Viola rostrata (N)
Viola rotundifolia (N)
Viola sagittata var. ovata (N)
Viola sagittata var. sagittata (N)
Viola selkirkii (N)
Viola × slavinii (N)
Viola sororia (N)
Viola striata (N)
Viola tricolor (I)
Viola triloba var. dilatata (N)
Viola triloba var. triloba (N)
Viola tripartita (N)
Viola walteri (N)
Viola × wittrockiana (I)
Vitex negundo var. heterophylla (I)
Vitis aestivalis var. aestivalis (N)
Vitis aestivalis var. bicolor (N)
Vitis cinerea var. baileyana (N)
Vitis labrusca (N)
Vitis riparia (N)
Vitis vulpina (N)
Vittaria appalachiana (N)
Vulpia bromoides (I)
Vulpia myuros (I)
Vulpia octoflora var. glauca (N)

W 
Waldsteinia fragarioides ssp. fragarioides (N)
Wisteria floribunda (I)
Wisteria frutescens (N)
Wolffia borealis (N)
Wolffia brasiliensis (N)
Wolffia columbiana (N)
Wolffiella gladiata (N)
Woodsia ilvensis (N)
Woodsia obtusa ssp. obtusa (N)
Woodwardia virginica (N)

X 
Xanthium spinosum (I)
Xanthium strumarium var. canadense (N)
Xanthium strumarium var. glabratum (N)
Xanthorhiza simplicissima (N)
Xyris difformis var. difformis (N)
Xyris torta (N)

Y 
Yucca filamentosa (N)

Z 
Zannichellia palustris (N)
Zanthoxylum americanum (N)
Zea mays ssp. mays (I)
Zelkova serrata (I)
Zigadenus elegans ssp. glaucus (N)
Zizania aquatica var. aquatica (N)
Zizania palustris var. interior (N)
Zizia aptera (N)
Zizia aurea (N)

See also 
 Flora
 Flora of the United States

References 
USDA PLANTS Database

External links 
 Indiana's invasive plant list
 Rare and Endanger plants of Indiana 2021
 Flora of North America

 
Flora of Indiana
Indiana